

Deaths in November

 
Deaths in November 2010:
 2: Andy Irons
 4: Sparky Anderson
 19: Pat Burns

Current sporting seasons

American football 2010

National Football League
NCAA Division I FBS
NCAA Division I FCS

Auto racing 2010

V8 Supercar

FIA GT1 World Championship

Deutsche Tourenwagen Masters

Basketball 2010

NBA

NCAA Division I men

Euroleague
EuroLeague Women
Eurocup
EuroChallenge

France
Germany
Greece

Israel
Italy
Philippines
Philippine Cup

Russia
Spain
Turkey

Football (soccer) 2010

National teams competitions
UEFA Euro 2012 qualifying
2012 Africa Cup of Nations qualification
International clubs competitions
UEFA (Europe) Champions League
UEFA Europa League
UEFA Women's Champions League

Copa Sudamericana

CAF Confederation Cup
CONCACAF (North & Central America) Champions League
OFC (Oceania) Champions League
Domestic (national) competitions
Argentina
Australia
Brazil
England
France
Germany
Iran
Italy
Japan

Russia
Scotland
Spain
Major League Soccer (USA & Canada)
MLS Cup Playoffs

Golf 2010

LPGA Tour

Ice hockey 2010

National Hockey League
Kontinental Hockey League
Czech Extraliga
Elitserien
Canadian Hockey League:
OHL, QMJHL, WHL
NCAA Division I men
NCAA Division I women

Rugby union 2010

Heineken Cup
European Challenge Cup
English Premiership
Celtic League
LV Cup
Top 14

Snooker

Players Tour Championship

Winter sports

Alpine Skiing World Cup

Bobsleigh World Cup
Cross-Country Skiing World Cup
Grand Prix of Figure Skating

Luge World Cup
Nordic Combined World Cup
Short Track Speed Skating World Cup
Skeleton World Cup
Ski Jumping World Cup
Snowboard World Cup
Speed Skating World Cup

Days of the month

November 30, 2010 (Tuesday)

Football (soccer)
Caribbean Championship Final Tournament in Martinique: (teams in bold advance to the semi-finals and qualify for 2011 CONCACAF Gold Cup)
Group H in Fort-de-France:
 0–0 
 0–1 
Final standings: Cuba 7 points, Grenada 5, Trinidad and Tobago 3, Martinique 1.

Other sports news
The American magazine Sports Illustrated names New Orleans Saints quarterback Drew Brees its Sportsman of the Year.

November 29, 2010 (Monday)

American football
NFL Monday Night Football Week 12: San Francisco 49ers 27, Arizona Cardinals 6

Cricket
England in Australia:
Ashes series:
First Test in Brisbane, day 5:  260 and 517/1d (152 overs; Alastair Cook 235*, Jonathan Trott 135*);  481 and 107/1 (26 overs). Match drawn; 5-match series level 0–0.

Football (soccer)
Caribbean Championship Final Tournament in Martinique: (team in bold advances to the semi-finals and qualifies for 2011 CONCACAF Gold Cup)
Group I in Riviére-Pilote:
 1–0 
 0–2 
Standings (after 2 matches): Jamaica 6 points, Antigua and Barbuda 3, Guyana, Guadeloupe 1.
 La Liga, matchday 13:
El Clásico: Barcelona 5–0 Real Madrid
Barcelona win the match for the fifth straight time.
Standings: Barcelona 34 points, Real Madrid 32, Villarreal 27, RCD Espanyol 25
2011 FIFA Women's World Cup draw in Frankfurt, Germany:

U.S. college sports
Conference realignment: TCU announces that it has accepted an invitation to join the Big East Conference effective in July 2012. TCU is the third school to leave the Mountain West Conference this year, after Utah and BYU.

November 28, 2010 (Sunday)

Alpine skiing
Men's World Cup in Lake Louise, Canada:
Super-G:  Tobias Grünenfelder  1:32.31  Carlo Janka  1:32.38  Romed Baumann  1:32.58
Overall standings (after 3 of 38 races): (1) Mario Scheiber  130 points (2) Silvan Zurbriggen  119 (3) Janka 116
Women's World Cup in Aspen, United States:
Slalom:  Maria Pietilä Holmner  1:46.19  Maria Riesch  1:46.87  Tanja Poutiainen  1:47.12
Slalom standings (after 2 of 10 races): (1) Riesch 160 points (2) Pietilä Holmner 124 (3) Poutiainen 120
Overall standings (after 4 of 38 races): (1) Riesch 234 points (2) Poutiainen 196 (3) Viktoria Rebensburg  180

American football
NFL Week 12:
Atlanta Falcons 20, Green Bay Packers 17
Pittsburgh Steelers 19, Buffalo Bills 16 (OT)
Cleveland Browns 24, Carolina Panthers 23
New York Giants 24, Jacksonville Jaguars 20
Minnesota Vikings 17, Washington Redskins 13
Houston Texans 20, Tennessee Titans 0
Kansas City Chiefs 42, Seattle Seahawks 24
Miami Dolphins 33, Oakland Raiders 17
St. Louis Rams 36, Denver Broncos 33
Chicago Bears 31, Philadelphia Eagles 26
Baltimore Ravens 17, Tampa Bay Buccaneers 10
Sunday Night Football: San Diego Chargers 36, Indianapolis Colts 14
NCAA:
Auburn takes over the top spot in the BCS standings from Oregon with one week remaining in the regular season. TCU remains at #3, followed by Stanford, Wisconsin, Ohio State, Arkansas, Michigan State, Oklahoma and LSU. Boise State drops out of the top 10 following its first loss in 2 seasons. The Sooners' rise to #9 makes them the Big 12 South representative in the conference title game against Nebraska. The Badgers are likely to go to the Rose Bowl as the Big Ten's highest ranked team in next week's final BCS ranking.

Canadian football
CFL Playoffs:
Grey Cup in Edmonton: Montreal Alouettes 21, Saskatchewan Roughriders 18
The Alouettes repeat their last year victory over the Roughriders, to win the Cup for the seventh time.

Cricket
England in Australia:
Ashes series:
First Test in Brisbane, day 4:  260 and 309/1 (101 overs; Alastair Cook 132*, Andrew Strauss 110);  481. England lead by 88 runs with 9 wickets remaining.
New Zealand in India:
1st ODI in Guwahati:  276 (49 overs; Virat Kohli 105);  236 (45.2 overs). India win by 40 runs; lead 5-match series 1–0.

Cross-country skiing
World Cup in Kuusamo, Finland:
Men's:
15 km Freestyle Handicap Start:  Lukáš Bauer  38:10.5  Ilia Chernousov  38:20.9  Marcus Hellner  38:26.6
Distance standings (after 3 of 17 races): (1) Hellner 165 points (2) Dario Cologna  144 (3) Daniel Rickardsson  127
Final Nordic Opening standings:  Alexander Legkov  1:05:17.1  Cologna 1:05:27.2  Rickardsson 1:05:31.3
Overall standings (after 5 of 31 races): (1) Legkov 318 points (2) Cologna 311 (3) Hellner 265
Women's:
10 km Freestyle Handicap Start:  Therese Johaug  29:24.2  Nicole Fessel  29:28.3  Justyna Kowalczyk  29:34.9
Distance standings (after 3 of 17 races): (1) Marit Bjørgen  190 points (2) Charlotte Kalla  151 (3) Kowalczyk 125
Final Nordic Opening standings:  Bjørgen 44:34.3  Kowalczyk 45:07.9  Kalla 45:20.0
Overall standings (after 5 of 31 races): (1) Bjørgen 440 points (2) Kalla 311 (3) Kowalczyk 309

Equestrianism
Show jumping:
FEI World Cup Central European League – South Sub-League:
5th competition in Celje (CSI 2*-W):  Juan Carlos Garcia  on Hilton Highlight  Melissa Vanzani  on Kador du Valon  Francesca Arioldi  on Lady Chanu
Dressage:
FEI World Cup Western European League:
3rd competition in Stockholm (CDI-W):  Adelinde Cornelissen  on Parzival  Anky van Grunsven  on Painted Black  Edward Gal  on Next One

Football (soccer)
Caribbean Championship Final Tournament in Martinique: (team in bold advances to the semi-finals and qualifies for 2011 CONCACAF Gold Cup)
Group H in Fort-de-France:
 1–0 
 0–1 
Standings (after 2 matches): Cuba 6 points, Grenada 4, Martinique 1, Trinidad and Tobago 0.
CAF Confederation Cup Final, first leg:
FUS Rabat  0–0  CS Sfaxien

Golf
European Tour:
Dubai World Championship in Dubai, United Arab Emirates:
Winner: Robert Karlsson  274 (−14)PO
Karlsson defeats Ian Poulter  on the second playoff hole to win his eleventh European Tour title.
Race to Dubai winner: Martin Kaymer

Luge
World Cup in Igls, Austria:
Men:  Felix Loch  1:40.398  David Möller  1:40.444  Armin Zöggeler  1:40.560
Team:   2:09.519   2:10.340   2:10.431

Rugby union
End of year tests:
Week 6:
 29–9  in Dublin

Ski jumping
World Cup in Kuusamo, Finland:
HS 142:  Andreas Kofler  331.2 points  Thomas Morgenstern  328.3  Simon Ammann  310.1

Snooker
Premier League:
Final in Hopton-on-Sea: Ronnie O'Sullivan  7–1 Shaun Murphy 
O'Sullivan wins his record-extending ninth Premier League title and the 45th professional title of his career.

Speed skating
World Cup 3 in Hamar, Norway:
1500 m women:  Christine Nesbitt  1:58.00  Marrit Leenstra  1:58.03  Brittany Schussler  1:58.96
Standings (after 3 of 6 races): (1) Nesbitt 300 points (2) Leenstra 186 (3) Schussler 170
10000 m men:  Bob de Jong  13:05.83  Ivan Skobrev  13:11.26  Jorrit Bergsma  13:13.98
Standings (after 3 of 6 races): (1) de Jong 260 points (2) Skobrev 200 (3) Jonathan Kuck  185
Team Pursuit women:   3:00.90   3:03.90   3:04.62
Standings (after 2 of 3 races): (1) Netherlands 150 points (2)  145 (3) Russia 130

Swimming
European Short Course Championships in Eindhoven, Netherlands:
Men's:
200m breaststroke:  Marco Koch  2:04.86  Melquiades Álvarez Caraballo  2:05.41  Anton Lobanov  2:06.71
100m individual medley:  Markus Deibler  52.13  Peter Mankoč  52.87  Alan Cabello Forns  53.24
200m freestyle:  Danila Izotov  1:41.84  Paul Biedermann  1:42.94  Yevgeny Lagunov  1:44.11
100m backstroke:  Stanislav Donets  49.35  Damiano Lestingi  51.46  Artem Dubovskoy  51.90
50m butterfly:  Steffen Deibler  22.34  Andriy Govorov  22.74  Joeri Verlinden  23.23
4 × 50 m freestyle relay:   1:25.16   1:25.19   1:25.81
Women's:
400m individual medley:  Zsuzsanna Jakabos  4:29.78  Anja Klinar  4:30.83  Lara Grangeon  4:30.93
200m freestyle:  Femke Heemskerk  1:52.62  Silke Lippok  1:53.96   Evelyn Verrasztó  1:54.39
100m butterfly:  Inge Dekker  56.51  Ingvild Snildal  57.46  Caterina Giacchetti  58.17
100m breaststroke:  Moniek Nijhuis  1:06.20  Sophie de Ronchi  1:06.21  Tessa Brouwer  1:06.65
200m backstroke:  Duane da Rocha Marce  2:03.97  Sharon van Rouwendaal  2:04.13  Daryna Zevina  2:05.08
50m freestyle:  Ranomi Kromowidjojo  23.58  Hinkelien Schreuder  23.90  Britta Steffen  23.95

Tennis
ATP World Tour:
Barclays ATP World Tour Finals in London, United Kingdom, day 8:
Singles Final: Roger Federer  [2] def. Rafael Nadal  [1] 6–3, 3–6, 6–1
Federer wins his fifth year-end championship, his fifth title of the season, and the 66th title of his career.
Doubles Final: Daniel Nestor  / Nenad Zimonjić  [2] def. Mahesh Bhupathi  / Max Mirnyi  [4] 7–6(6), 6–4
Nestor and Zimonjić win their second year-end championship as a pairing, with Nestor winning the tournament for the third time.
They also win their seventh title of the season, giving Zimonjić his 39th career title and Nestor his 71st.

November 27, 2010 (Saturday)

Alpine skiing
Men's World Cup in Lake Louise, Canada:
Downhill:  Michael Walchhofer  1:47.78  Mario Scheiber  1:48.33  Aksel Lund Svindal  1:48.33
Overall standings (after 2 of 38 races): (1) Jean-Baptiste Grange  and Walchhofer 100 points (3) Silvan Zurbriggen  90
Women's World Cup in Aspen, United States:
Giant slalom:  Tessa Worley  2:06.81  Viktoria Rebensburg  2:06.82  Kathrin Hölzl  2:06.83
Giant slalom standings (after 2 of 8 races): (1) Rebensburg 180 points (2) Hölzl 140 (3) Worley 132
Overall standings (after 3 of 38 races): (1) Rebensburg 180 points (2) Maria Riesch  154 (3) Hölzl 146

American football
NCAA Division I FBS (unbeaten teams in bold):
BCS Top 10:
(3) TCU 66, New Mexico 17
The Horned Frogs finish the regular season with a perfect 12–0 record for the second successive year and all but secure a BCS berth.
Battle for the Golden Boot: (12) Arkansas 31, (5) LSU 23
(6) Stanford 38, Oregon State 0
(7) Wisconsin 70, Northwestern 23
Michigan–Ohio State rivalry: (8) Ohio State 37, Michigan 7
Bedlam Series: (13) Oklahoma 47, (9) Oklahoma State 41
The Sooners' win creates a three-way tie atop the Big 12 South involving the two Oklahoma teams and Texas A&M. The BCS standings, to be released on November 28, will determine the opponent for Nebraska in the Big 12 Championship Game.
Land Grant Trophy: (10) Michigan State 28, Penn State 22
The Spartans earn a share of the Big 10 title with Ohio State and Wisconsin for the first time in 20 years. The Big 10 representative in the Rose Bowl will be determined by the BCS ranking of December 5, with the Badgers currently in highest position.
Played earlier this week: (1) Oregon, (2) Auburn, (4) Boise State
Other games:
Border War: (14) Missouri 35, Kansas 7
Commonwealth Cup: (16) Virginia Tech 37, Virginia 7
Clemson–South Carolina rivalry: (18) South Carolina 29, Clemson 7
The Holy War: (20) Utah 17, Brigham Young 16
Florida–Florida State rivalry: (22) Florida State 31, Florida 7
Maryland 38, (23) North Carolina State 31
The Wolfpack's loss gives Florida State the ACC Atlantic title outright, and sends the Seminoles to Charlotte for the ACC Championship Game against Virginia Tech.
Floyd of Rosedale: Minnesota 27, (24) Iowa 24
Egg Bowl: (25) Mississippi State 31, Mississippi 23
Notre Dame–USC rivalry: Notre Dame 20, USC 16
The Fighting Irish claim the Jeweled Shillelagh for the first time since 2001.
Hawaii 59, New Mexico State 24
The Warriors secure at least a share of the WAC championship.
FIU 31, Arkansas State 24
The Golden Panthers secure their first ever Sun Belt championship.
NCAA Division I FCS:
NCAA Division I Football Championship First Round:
Western Illinois 17, Coastal Carolina 10
Lehigh 14, Northern Iowa 7
Georgia Southern 41, South Carolina State 16
North Dakota State 43, Robert Morris 17
Bayou Classic in New Orleans: Grambling 38, Southern 17

Bobsleigh
World Cup in Whistler, Canada:
Four-man:  Steve Holcomb/Justin Olsen/Steven Langton/Curtis Tomasevicz  1:42.84   Maximilian Arndt/Rene Tiefert/Martin Putze/Alexander Rödiger  1:43.01  Manuel Machata/Andreas Bredau/Michail Makarow/Christian Poser  1:43.05

Canadian football
CIS football:
Vanier Cup in Quebec City: Laval Rouge et Or 29, Calgary Dinos 2
Laval win the Cup for the sixth time.

Cricket
West Indies in Sri Lanka:
2nd Test in Colombo, day 5:  387/9d and 57/1d (15 overs);  243 (71.3 overs) and 12/2 (11 overs). Match drawn; 3-match series level 0–0.
England in Australia:
Ashes series:
First Test in Brisbane, day 3:  260 and 19/0 (15 overs);  481 (158.4 overs; Michael Hussey 195, Brad Haddin 136, Steven Finn 6/125). England trail by 202 runs with 10 wickets remaining.

Cross-country skiing
World Cup in Kuusamo, Finland:
Men's 10 km Classic:  Dario Cologna  23:24.8  Alexander Legkov  23:31.5  Daniel Rickardsson  23:32.3
Distance standings (after 2 of 17 races): (1) Cologna 130 points (2) Marcus Hellner  122 (3) Rickardsson 103
Overall standings (after 3 of 31 races): (1) Cologna 137 points (2) Hellner 122 (3) Rickardsson 103
Women's 5 km Classic:  Marit Bjørgen  12:51.9  Justyna Kowalczyk  12:54.0  Petra Majdič  13:08.7
Distance standings (after 2 of 17 races): (1) Bjørgen 150 points (2) Charlotte Kalla  114 (3) Kowalczyk 82
Overall standings (after 3 of 31 races): (1) Bjørgen 200 points (2) Kalla 154 (3) Majdič 111

Figure skating
ISU Grand Prix:
Trophée Eric Bompard in Paris, France: (skaters in bold qualify for the Final)
Pairs:  Aliona Savchenko / Robin Szolkowy  197.88  Vera Bazarova / Yuri Larionov  183.00  Maylin Hausch / Daniel Wende  157.42
Final standings: Savchenko / Szolkowy, Pang Qing / Tong Jian  30 points, Bazarova / Larionov, Kirsten Moore-Towers / Dylan Moscovitch  26, Lubov Iliushechkina / Nodari Maisuradze , Sui Wenjing / Han Cong , Narumi Takahashi / Mervin Tran  24.
Men:  Takahiko Kozuka  248.07  Florent Amodio  229.38  Brandon Mroz  214.31
Final standings: Kozuka, Daisuke Takahashi  30 points, Patrick Chan  28, Tomáš Verner , Nobunari Oda  26, Amodio, Jeremy Abbott , Mroz 24.
Ladies:  Kiira Korpi  169.74  Mirai Nagasu  167.79  Alissa Czisny  159.80
Final standings: Miki Ando  30 points, Czisny, Carolina Kostner , Kanako Murakami , Akiko Suzuki , Rachael Flatt  26.
Ice Dance:  Nathalie Péchalat / Fabian Bourzat  161.82  Ekaterina Riazanova / Ilia Tkachenko 146.79  Madison Chock / Greg Zuerlein  138.48
Final standings: Meryl Davis / Charlie White , Péchalat / Bourzat 30 points, Vanessa Crone / Paul Poirier , Ekaterina Bobrova / Dmitri Soloviev  28, Kaitlyn Weaver / Andrew Poje , Nóra Hoffmann / Maxim Zavozin , Maia Shibutani / Alex Shibutani , Chock / Zuerlein 22.

Football (soccer)
2011 FIFA Women's World Cup qualification:
UEFA-CONCACAF play-off, second leg in Bridgeview, Illinois: (first leg score in parentheses)
 1–0 (1–0) . United States win 2–0 on aggregate and qualify for the World Cup.
Caribbean Championship Final Tournament in Martinique:
Group I in Riviére-Pilote:
 1–1 
 3–1

Luge
World Cup in Igls, Austria:
Women:  Tatjana Hüfner  1:19.594  Natalie Geisenberger  1:19.802  Erin Hamlin  1:19.974
Doubles:  Andreas Linger/Wolfgang Linger  1:18.946  Christian Oberstolz/Patrick Gruber  1:19.127  Peter Penz/Georg Fischler  1:19.142

Nordic combined
World Cup in Kuusamo, Finland:
HS 142 / 10 km:  Felix Gottwald  28:17.5  Mikko Kokslien  28:25.0  Jason Lamy-Chappuis  28:27.0
Overall standings (after 2 of 12 races): (1) Lamy-Chappuis 160 points (2) Gottwald 150 (3) Eric Frenzel  125

Rugby union
2011 Rugby World Cup qualifying:
Final Place Play-off Qualification Final, second leg in Bucharest (first leg score in parentheses):
 39–12 (21–21) . Romania win 60–33 on aggregate and qualify for the World Cup.
End of year tests:
Week 6:
 19–17  in Tbilisi
 24–16  in Modena
 11–21  in London
 19–16  in Aberdeen
 33–20  in Palma de Mallorca
 20–23  in Lisbon
 25–37  in Cardiff
New Zealand's Dan Carter scores 12 points and becomes the highest point scorer in Test rugby with 1188 points, 10 ahead of Jonny Wilkinson .
The All Blacks also complete their fourth successful Grand Slam tour and their third since 2005.
 16–59  in Saint-Denis

Ski jumping
World Cup in Kuusamo, Finland:
HS 142 team:   1231.4 points   1163.4   1121.3

Snooker
Premier League:
Semi-finals in Hopton-on-Sea:
Marco Fu  2–5 Shaun Murphy 
Ronnie O'Sullivan  5–1 Neil Robertson

Speed skating
World Cup 3 in Hamar, Norway:
1500 m men:  Trevor Marsicano  1:45.54  Simon Kuipers  1:45.97  Shani Davis  1:45.98
Standings (after 3 of 6 races): (1) Davis 210 points (2) Kuipers 205 (3) Marsicano 201
5000 m women:  Stephanie Beckert  6:59.18  Martina Sáblíková  7:03.95  Eriko Ishino  7:06.70
Standings (after 3 of 6 races): (1) Beckert 270 points (2) Jilleanne Rookard  200 (3) Sáblíková 160
Team Pursuit men:   3:43.58   3:44.61   3:47.01
Standings (after 2 of 3 races): (1) United States 200 points (2) Norway 150 (3) Canada 130

Swimming
European Short Course Championships in Eindhoven, Netherlands:
Men's:
1500m freestyle:  Federico Colbertaldo  14:35.36  Sergiy Frolov  14:42.01  Job Kienhuis  14:42.39
200m butterfly:  Dinko Jukić  1:53.35  Tim Wallburger  1:53.71  Bence Biczó  1:53.75
100m freestyle:  Danila Izotov  46.56  Yevgeny Lagunov  46.60  Luca Dotto  47.09
50m breaststroke:  Robin van Aggele  26.44  Aleksander Hetland  26.56  Fabio Scozzoli  26.68  Hendrik Feldwehr  26.68
Women's:
400m freestyle:  Ágnes Mutina  4:01.25  Melanie Costa Schmid  4:02.26  Gráinne Murphy  4:02.86
100m individual medley:  Evelyn Verrasztó  59.53  Hinkelien Schreuder  59.57  Theresa Michalak  59.85
50m backstroke:  Sanja Jovanović  27.10  Elena Gemo  27.13  Simona Baumrtová  27.30
4 × 50 m medley relay:   1:44.98   1:47.70   1:49.56

Tennis
ATP World Tour:
Barclays ATP World Tour Finals in London, United Kingdom, day 7:
Singles Semifinals:
Rafael Nadal  [1] def. Andy Murray  [5] 7–6(5), 3–6, 7–6(6)
Roger Federer  [2] def. Novak Djokovic  [3] 6–1, 6–4
Doubles Semifinals:
Daniel Nestor  / Nenad Zimonjić  [2] def. Bob Bryan  / Mike Bryan  [1] 6–3, 3–6, [12–10]
Mahesh Bhupathi  / Max Mirnyi  [4] def. Mariusz Fyrstenberg  / Marcin Matkowski  [6] 6–4, 6–4

Volleyball
Asian Games in Guangzhou, China:
Women:
Bronze medal game:   3–0 
Final:   2–3

November 26, 2010 (Friday)

American football
NCAA (unbeaten teams in bold):
BCS Top 10:
(1) Oregon 49, (21) Arizona 28
The Ducks clinch at least a share of the Pac-10 title, and also earn the automatic Pac-10 BCS berth.
Iron Bowl: (2) Auburn 28, (11) Alabama 27
The Tigers finish the regular season with a perfect 12–0 record.
(19) Nevada 34, (4) Boise State 31 (OT)
The Wolf Pack stop the Broncos' winning streak at 24 games, since the 2008 Poinsettia Bowl, and 37 regular season games.
Other games:
(15) Nebraska 45, Colorado 17
The Cornhuskers win the Big 12 North and punch their ticket to the Big 12 Championship Game.
Backyard Brawl: West Virginia 35, Pittsburgh 10
Kent State 28, Ohio 6
The Bobcats' loss gives Miami (OH) the MAC East title and a trip to Detroit to take on Northern Illinois in the MAC Championship Game.
SMU 45, East Carolina 38 (OT)
Tulsa 56, Southern Miss 50
With these results, the participants in the Conference USA Championship Game are set, with SMU playing UCF in Orlando.

Basketball
Asian Games in Guangzhou, China:
Men:
Bronze medal game:  66–74  
Gold medal game:   71–77

Bobsleigh
World Cup in Whistler, Canada:
Women:  Sandra Kiriasis/Stephanie Schneider  1:47.70  Shauna Rohbock/Valerie Fleming  1:47.99  Kaillie Humphries/Heather Hughes  1:48.17

Cricket
West Indies in Sri Lanka:
2nd Test in Colombo, day 4:  387/9d;  165/5 (45 overs). West Indies trail by 222 runs with 5 wickets remaining in the 1st innings.
England in Australia:
Ashes series:
First Test in Brisbane, day 2:  260;  220/5 (80 overs). Australia trail by 40 runs with 5 wickets remaining in the 1st innings.
Asian Games in Guangzhou, China:
Men:
Bronze medal match:  135 (19.5 overs);   141/4 (18 overs). Pakistan win by 6 wickets.
Final:   118/8 (20 overs);   119/5 (19.3 overs). Bangladesh win by 5 wickets.

Cross-country skiing
World Cup in Kuusamo, Finland:
Men's Sprint Classic:  John Kristian Dahl   Alexey Poltaranin   Sami Jauhojärvi 
Overall standings (after 2 of 31 races): (1) Marcus Hellner  100 points (2) Dario Cologna  87 (3) Daniel Rickardsson  60
Women's Sprint Classic:  Marit Bjørgen   Petra Majdič   Astrid Uhrenholdt Jacobsen 
Overall standings (after 2 of 31 races): (1) Bjørgen 150 points (2) Charlotte Kalla  120 (3) Arianna Follis  90

Figure skating
ISU Grand Prix:
Trophée Eric Bompard in Paris, France:
Pairs Short Program: (1) Aliona Savchenko / Robin Szolkowy  66.65 (2) Vera Bazarova / Yuri Larionov  64.18 (3) Maylin Hausch / Daniel Wende  54.02
Men Short Program: (1) Takahiko Kozuka  77.64 (2) Florent Amodio  75.62 (3) Brandon Mroz   72.46
Ladies Short Program: (1) Kiira Korpi  61.39 (2) Mirai Nagasu  58.72 (3) Haruka Imai   58.38
Ice Dance Short Dance: (1) Nathalie Péchalat / Fabian Bourzat  65.48 (2) Ekaterina Riazanova / Ilia Tkachenko  60.81 (3) Madison Chock / Greg Zuerlein  58.09

Football (soccer)
Caribbean Championship Final Tournament in Martinique:
Group H in Fort-de-France:
 0–2 
 1–1

Handball
Asian Games in Guangzhou, China:
Men:
Bronze medal game:   27–20 
Gold medal game:   28–32  
Women:
Bronze medal game:   38–26 
Gold medal game:   22–31

Nordic combined
World Cup in Kuusamo, Finland:
HS 142 / 10 km:  Jason Lamy-Chappuis  28:33.5  Eric Frenzel  28:40.1  Mario Stecher  28:45.2

Rugby union
End of year tests:
Week 6:
French Barbarians 27–28  in Grenoble

Skeleton
World Cup in Whistler, Canada:
Men:  Jon Montgomery  1:47.56  Kristan Bromley  1:47.84  Aleksandr Tretyakov  1:47.88

Softball
Asian Games in Guangzhou, China:
Women:
Final:   1–2 
Grand Final:   2–0

Swimming
European Short Course Championships in Eindhoven, Netherlands:
Men's:
400m individual medley:  Dávid Verrasztó  4:03.06  Yannick Lebherz  4:05.08  Federico Turrini  4:05.24
100m breaststroke:  Fabio Scozzoli  57.78  Hendrik Feldwehr  58.09  Robin van Aggele  58.68
100m butterfly:  Steffen Deibler  49.95  Joeri Verlinden  50.52  Peter Mankoč  50.92
50m backstroke:  Stanislav Donets  22.74 (ER)  Vitaly Borisov  23.72  Nick Driebergen  23.73
Women's:
800m freestyle:  Federica Pellegrini  8:15.20  Boglárka Kapás  8:18.56  Gráinne Murphy  8:19.45
200m breaststroke:  Anastasia Chaun  2:22.68  Tanja Smid  2:22.88  Chiara Boggiatto  2:24.52
100m freestyle:  Ranomi Kromowidjojo  51.44  Femke Heemskerk  52.02  Britta Steffen  52.92
100m backstroke:  Daryna Zevina  57.57  Sharon van Rouwendaal  57.91  Duane da Rocha Marce  58.37
50m butterfly:  Inge Dekker  25.38  Hinkelien Schreuder  25.49  Triin Aljand  25.90
4 × 50 m freestyle relay:   1:34.34   1:36.83   1:39.02

Tennis
ATP World Tour:
Barclays ATP World Tour Finals in London, United Kingdom, day 6: (players in bold advance to the semifinals)
Singles – Group A:
Rafael Nadal  [1] def. Tomáš Berdych  [6] 7–6(3), 6–1
Novak Djokovic  [3] def. Andy Roddick  [8] 6–2, 6–3
Final standings: Nadal 3–0, Djokovic 2–1, Berdych 1–2, Roddick 0–3.
Doubles – Group B:
Łukasz Kubot  / Oliver Marach  [5] def. Daniel Nestor  / Nenad Zimonjić  [2] 6–0, 1–6, [10–6]
Mahesh Bhupathi  / Max Mirnyi  [4] def. Wesley Moodie  / Dick Norman  [8] 6–4, 6–4
Final standings: Nestor/Zimonjić, Bhupathi/Mirnyi 2–1, Moodie/Norman, Kubot/Marach 1–2.

Volleyball
Asian Games in Guangzhou, China:
Men:
Bronze medal game:   3–0 
Final:   3–1

November 25, 2010 (Thursday)

American football
NFL Week 12: Thanksgiving Day games
New England Patriots 45, Detroit Lions 24
New Orleans Saints 30, Dallas Cowboys 27
New York Jets 26, Cincinnati Bengals 10
NCAA Division I FBS BCS Top 25:
State Farm Lone Star Showdown: (17) Texas A&M 24, Texas 17

Basketball
Asian Games in Guangzhou, China:
Women:
Bronze medal game:   73–61 
Gold medal game:   64–70  
Euroleague:
Regular Season, matchday 6:
Group A:
Partizan Belgrade  68–62  Žalgiris Kaunas
Maccabi Tel Aviv  81–70  Caja Laboral
Standings (after 6 games): Maccabi Tel Aviv 5–1, Žalgiris, Partizan 4–2, Caja Laboral,  Khimki Moscow 2–4,  Asseco Prokom Gdynia 1–5.
Group B:
Spirou Basket  79–74  Unicaja Málaga
Brose Baskets  67–68  Virtus Roma
Real Madrid  82–68  Olympiacos Piraeus
Standings (after 6 games): Olympiacos, Real Madrid 4–2, Unicaja, Virtus Roma 3–3, Brose Baskets, Spirou Charleroi 2–4.
Group C: KK Cibona Zagreb  75–94  Regal FC Barcelona
Standings (after 6 games):  Montepaschi Siena,  Fenerbahçe Ülker 5–1, Regal FC Barcelona 4–2,  Cholet Basket 3–3,  Lietuvos Rytas 1–5, Cibona Zagreb 0–6.
Group D:
Panathinaikos Athens  69–73  Power Electronics Valencia
Efes Pilsen Istanbul  84–78  Union Olimpija Ljubljana
Standings (after 6 games): Panathinaikos, Efes Pilsen, Union Olimpija 4–2,  Armani Jeans Milano 3–3, Power Electronics 2–4,  CSKA Moscow 1–5.

Bobsleigh
World Cup in Whistler, Canada:
Two-man:  Manuel Manchata/Andreas Bredau  1:44.06  Lyndon Rush/Neville Wright  1:44.25  Karl Angerer/Christian Friedrich  1:44.25

Cricket
West Indies in Sri Lanka:
2nd Test in Colombo, day 3:  387/9d (115.2 overs; Kumar Sangakkara 150, Kemar Roach 5/100);  165/5 (45 overs). West Indies trail by 222 runs with 5 wickets remaining in the 1st innings.
England in Australia:
Ashes series:
First Test in Brisbane, day 1:  260 (76.5 overs; Peter Siddle 6/54);  25/0 (7 overs). Australia trail by 235 runs with 10 wickets remaining in the 1st innings.
On his birthday, Siddle bowls the 38th hat-trick in Test cricket, and the first by an Australian since Glenn McGrath in 2000–01. Siddle's hat-trick was the first in an Ashes test since Darren Gough in 1998–99 and the first by an Australian in an Ashes test since Shane Warne in 1994–95.

Field hockey
Asian Games in Guangzhou, China:
Men:
Bronze medal match:  0–1  
Gold medal match:   2–0

Football (soccer)
Asian Games in Guangzhou, China:
Men:
Bronze medal match:  3–4  
Gold medal match:   1–0  
Copa Sudamericana Semifinals, second leg: (first leg score in parentheses)
Independiente  2–1 (2–3)  LDU Quito. 3–3 on points, 4–4 on aggregate; Independiente win on away goals.

Skeleton
World Cup in Whistler, Canada:
Women:  Marion Thees  1:48.98  Mellisa Hollingsworth  1:49.40  Anja Huber  1:50.07

Swimming
European Short Course Championships in Eindhoven, Netherlands:
Men's:
400m freestyle:  Paul Biedermann  3:39.51  Federico Colbertaldo  3:41.70  Alexander Selin  3:43.70
200m backstroke:  Yannick Lebherz  1:51.74  Damiano Lestingi  1:51.84  Artem Dubovskoy  1:52.72
200m individual medley:  Markus Deibler  1:53.25  Vytautas Janušaitis  1:54.07  Dinko Jukić  1:54.93
50m freestyle:  Steffen Deibler  20.98  Marco Orsi  21.17  Andriy Govorov  21.32
4 × 50 m medley relay:   1:33.40   1:33.83   1:34.25
Women's:
200m individual medley:  Evelyn Verrasztó  2:07.06  Kimberly Buys  2:10.14  Lara Grangeon  2:10.22
200m butterfly:  Zsuzsanna Jakabos  2:05.58  Alessia Polieri  2:06.18  Caterina Giacchetti  2:06.49
50m breaststroke:  Dorothea Brandt  30.40  Moniek Nijhuis  30.45  Valentina Artemyeva  30.55

Tennis
ATP World Tour:
Barclays ATP World Tour Finals in London, United Kingdom, day 5: (players in bold advance to the semifinals)
Singles – Group B:
Roger Federer  [2] def. Robin Söderling  [4] 7–6(5), 6–3
Andy Murray  [5] def. David Ferrer  [7] 6–2, 6–2
Final standings: Federer 3–0, Murray 2–1, Söderling 1–2, Ferrer 0–3.
Doubles – Group A:
Bob Bryan  / Mike Bryan  [1] def. Lukáš Dlouhý  / Leander Paes  [3] 6–3, 6–4
Mariusz Fyrstenberg  / Marcin Matkowski  [6] def. Jürgen Melzer  / Philipp Petzschner  [7] 6–3, 7–6(7)
Final standings: Fyrstenberg/Matkowski 3–0, Bryan/Bryan 2–1, Melzer/Petzschner 1–2, Dlouhý/Paes 0–3.

Water polo
Asian Games in Guangzhou, China:
Men:
3rd place match:  5–19  
Final:   6–7

November 24, 2010 (Wednesday)

Basketball
Euroleague:
Regular Season, matchday 6:
Group A: Asseco Prokom Gdynia  71–67  Khimki Moscow
Group C:
Lietuvos Rytas  75–81  Fenerbahçe Ülker
Cholet Basket  61–70  Montepaschi Siena
Group D: Armani Jeans Milano  71–65  CSKA Moscow

Cricket
Pakistan vs South Africa in UAE:
2nd Test in Abu Dhabi, day 5:  584/9d and 203/5d (55 overs);  434 and 153/3 (67 overs). Match drawn; 2-match series drawn 0–0.
West Indies in Sri Lanka:
2nd Test in Colombo, day 2:  294/5 (90 overs; Kumar Sangakkara 135*); .

Field hockey
Asian Games in Guangzhou, China:
Women:
Bronze medal match:   1–0 (a.e.t.) 
Final:   0–0 (5–4 pen.)

Football (soccer)
UEFA Champions League group stage, matchday 5: (teams in bold advance to the Round of 16, teams in italics advance to the Europa League Round of 32)
Group A:
Internazionale  1–0  Twente
Tottenham Hotspur  3–0  Werder Bremen
Standings (after 5 matches): Tottenham Hotspur, Internazionale 10 points, Twente 5, Werder Bremen 2.
Group B:
Schalke 04  3–0  Lyon
Hapoel Tel Aviv  3–0  Benfica
Hapoel Tel Aviv score the first win of an Israeli club in the Champions League group stage since Maccabi Tel Aviv beat Ajax in 2004–05.
Standings (after 5 matches): Schalke 04 10 points, Lyon 9, Benfica 6, Hapoel Tel Aviv 4.
Group C:
Rangers  0–1  Manchester United
Valencia  6–1  Bursaspor
Standings (after 5 matches): Manchester United 13 points, Valencia 10, Rangers 5, Bursaspor 0.
Group D:
Rubin Kazan  1–0  Copenhagen
Panathinaikos  0–3  Barcelona
Standings (after 5 matches): Barcelona 11 points, Copenhagen 7, Rubin Kazan 6, Panathinaikos 2.
Copa Sudamericana Semifinals, second leg: (first leg score in parentheses)
Palmeiras  1–2 (1–0)  Goiás. 3–3 on points, 2–2 on aggregate; Goiás win on away goals rule.

Tennis
ATP World Tour:
Barclays ATP World Tour Finals in London, United Kingdom, day 4: (players in bold advance to the semifinals)
Singles – Group A:
Tomáš Berdych  [6] def. Andy Roddick  [8] 7–5, 6–3
Rafael Nadal  [1] def. Novak Djokovic  [3] 7–5, 6–2
Standings: Nadal 2–0, Djokovic, Berdych 1–1, Roddick 0–2.
Doubles – Group B:
Wesley Moodie  / Dick Norman  [8] def. Łukasz Kubot  / Oliver Marach  [5] 6–1, 6–3
Daniel Nestor  / Nenad Zimonjić  [2] def. Mahesh Bhupathi  / Max Mirnyi  [4] 7–6(5), 7–6(1)
Standings: Nestor/Zimonjić 2–0, Bhupathi/Mirnyi, Moodie/Norman 1–1, Kubot/Marach 0–2.

November 23, 2010 (Tuesday)

Baseball
Major League Baseball awards:
American League Most Valuable Player: Josh Hamilton, Texas Rangers

Cricket
Pakistan vs South Africa in UAE:
2nd Test in Abu Dhabi, day 4:  584/9d and 173/4 (49 overs);  434 (144.1 overs). South Africa lead by 323 runs with 6 wickets remaining.
New Zealand in India:
3rd Test in Nagpur, day 4:  193 and 175 (51.2 overs);  566/8d. India win by an innings and 198 runs; win 3-match series 1–0.
West Indies in Sri Lanka:
2nd Test in Colombo, day 1:  84/3 (37.2 overs); .

Football (soccer)
UEFA Champions League group stage, matchday 5: (teams in bold advance to the Round of 16, teams in italics advance to the Europa League Round of 32)
Group E:
Roma  3–2  Bayern Munich
Basel  1–0  CFR Cluj
Standings (after 5 matches): Bayern Munich 12 points, Roma 9, Basel 6, CFR Cluj 3.
Group F:
Spartak Moscow  0–3  Marseille
Chelsea  2–1  Žilina
Standings (after 5 matches): Chelsea 15 points, Marseille 9, Spartak Moscow 6, Žilina 0.
Group G:
Ajax  0–4  Real Madrid
Auxerre  0–2  Milan
Standings (after 5 matches): Real Madrid 13 points, Milan 8, Ajax 4, Auxerre 3.
Group H:
Braga  2–0  Arsenal
Partizan  0–3  Shakhtar Donetsk
Standings (after 5 matches): Shakhtar Donetsk 12 points, Arsenal, Braga 9, Partizan 0.

Rugby union
Asian Games in Guangzhou, China:
Men:
Bronze medal match:   21–14 
Final:   28–21  
Women:
Bronze medal match:  12–17  
Final:   14–17

Tennis
ATP World Tour:
Barclays ATP World Tour Finals in London, United Kingdom, day 3:
Singles – Group B:
Roger Federer  [2] def. Andy Murray  [5] 6–4, 6–2
Robin Söderling  [4] def. David Ferrer  [7] 7–5, 7–5
Standings: Federer 2–0, Murray, Söderling 1–1, Ferrer 0–2.
Doubles – Group A:
Jürgen Melzer  / Philipp Petzschner  [7] def. Lukáš Dlouhý  / Leander Paes  [3] 7–6(9), 4–6, [10–8]
Mariusz Fyrstenberg  / Marcin Matkowski  [6] def. Bob Bryan  / Mike Bryan  [1] 2–6, 7–6(4), [10–8]
Standings: Fyrstenberg/Matkowski 2–0, Bryan/Bryan, Melzer/Petzschner 1–1, Dlouhý/Paes 0–2.
Asian Games in Guangzhou, China:
Men's Final:  Somdev Devvarman  def.  Denis Istomin  6–1, 6–2
Women's Final:  Peng Shuai  def.  Akgul Amanmuradova  7–5, 6–2

November 22, 2010 (Monday)

American football
NFL Monday Night Football, Week 11: San Diego Chargers 35, Denver Broncos 14
The Minnesota Vikings fire head coach Brad Childress and name defensive coordinator Leslie Frazier as interim replacement.

Baseball
Major League Baseball awards:
National League Most Valuable Player: Joey Votto, Cincinnati Reds

Cricket
Pakistan vs South Africa in UAE:
2nd Test in Abu Dhabi, day 3:  584/9d;  317/6 (106 overs). Pakistan trail by 267 runs with 4 wickets remaining in the 1st innings.
New Zealand in India:
3rd Test in Nagpur, day 3:  193 and 24/1 (11 overs);  566/8d (165 overs; Rahul Dravid 191). New Zealand trail by 349 runs with 9 wickets remaining.

Football (soccer)
Asian Games in Guangzhou, China:
Women:
Bronze medal match:   2–0 
Final:   0–1

Tennis
ATP World Tour:
Barclays ATP World Tour Finals in London, United Kingdom, day 2:
Singles – Group A:
Novak Djokovic  [3] def. Tomáš Berdych  [6] 6–3, 6–3
Rafael Nadal  [1] def. Andy Roddick  [8] 3–6, 7–6(3), 6–4
Doubles – Group B:
Mahesh Bhupathi  / Max Mirnyi  [3] def. Łukasz Kubot  / Oliver Marach  [5] 7–6(2), 6–4
Daniel Nestor  / Nenad Zimonjić  [2] def. Wesley Moodie  / Dick Norman  [7] 6–1, 6–2

November 21, 2010 (Sunday)

American football
NFL Week 11:
Buffalo Bills 49, Cincinnati Bengals 31
Dallas Cowboys 35, Detroit Lions 19
Washington Redskins 19, Tennessee Titans 16 (OT)
Kansas City Chiefs 31, Arizona Cardinals 13
Green Bay Packers 31, Minnesota Vikings 3
New York Jets 30, Houston Texans 27
Pittsburgh Steelers 35, Oakland Raiders 3
Baltimore Ravens 37, Carolina Panthers 13
Jacksonville Jaguars 24, Cleveland Browns 20
Tampa Bay Buccaneers 21, San Francisco 49ers 0
New Orleans Saints 34, Seattle Seahawks 19
Atlanta Falcons 34, St. Louis Rams 17
New England Patriots 31, Indianapolis Colts 28
Sunday Night Football: Philadelphia Eagles 27, New York Giants 17

Auto racing
Chase for the Sprint Cup:
Ford 400 in Homestead, Florida: (1)  Carl Edwards (Ford, Roush Fenway Racing) (2)  Jimmie Johnson (Chevrolet, Hendrick Motorsports) (3)  Kevin Harvick (Chevrolet, Richard Childress Racing)
Final drivers' championship standings: (1) Johnson 6622 points (2)  Denny Hamlin (Toyota, Joe Gibbs Racing) 6583  (3) Harvick 6581
Johnson extends his record streak of Cup Series championships to five. He also becomes the first driver in the seven-year history of the Chase, and the fourth overall, to overcome a points deficit in the season's final race.
V8 Supercars:
Norton 360 Sandown Challenge, Race 24 in Melbourne, Victoria: (1) James Courtney  (Ford Falcon) (2) Mark Winterbottom  (Ford Falcon) (3) Jamie Whincup  (Holden Commodore)
Drivers' championship standings (after 24 of 26 races): (1) Courtney 2932 points (2) Whincup 2879 (3) Winterbottom 2729
World Touring Car Championship:
Guia Race of Macau:
Round 21: (1) Rob Huff  (Chevrolet; Chevrolet Cruze) (2) Yvan Muller  (Chevrolet; Chevrolet Cruze) (3) Tiago Monteiro  (SR-Sport; SEAT León)
Round 22: (1) Norbert Michelisz  (Zengő Dension-Team; SEAT León) (2) Gabriele Tarquini  (SR-Sport; SEAT León) (3) Huff
Final drivers' championship standings: (1) Muller 331 points (2) Tarquini 276 (3) Huff 276
Final manufacturers' championship standings: (1) Chevrolet 715 points (2) SEAT Customers Technology 641 (3) BMW 580

Canadian football
CFL Playoffs:
Division Finals:
East in Montreal: Montreal Alouettes 48, Toronto Argonauts 17
West in Calgary: Saskatchewan Roughriders 20, Calgary Stampeders 16

Cricket
Pakistan vs South Africa in UAE:
2nd Test in Abu Dhabi, day 2:  584/9d (153 overs; AB de Villiers 278*, Tanvir Ahmed 6/120);  59/1 (18 overs). Pakistan trail by 525 runs with 9 wickets remaining in the 1st innings.
De Villiers compiles the highest individual score by a South African in a Test innings, surpassing Graeme Smith's 277 against England in 2003.
New Zealand in India:
3rd Test in Nagpur, day 2:  193 (66.3 overs);  292/2 (82 overs). India lead by 99 runs with 8 wickets remaining in the 1st innings.

Cross-country skiing
World Cup in Gällivare, Sweden:
Men's 4x10 km:   I 1:29:56.3   I 1:29:57.1   I 1:30:44.2
Women's 4x5 km:   I 50:16.0   I 50:42.8   I 51:12.2

Equestrianism
Show jumping:
FEI World Cup Western European League:
5th competition in Stuttgart (CSI 5*-W):  Carsten-Otto Nagel  on Corradina  Marcus Ehning  on Küchengirl  Billy Twomey  on Tinka's Serenade
Standings (after 5 of 13 competitions): (1) Kevin Staut  43 points (2) Christian Ahlmann  40 (3) Meredith Michaels-Beerbaum  37
Dressage:
Stuttgart German Masters in Stuttgart (CDI 5*):
Grand Prix Spécial:  Isabell Werth  on El Santo NRW  Victoria Max-Theurer  on Augustin OLD  Edward Gal  on Sisther de Jeu

Football (soccer)
Sudamericano Femenino in Ecuador: (teams in bold qualify for the 2011 FIFA Women's World Cup)
Second stage:
 1–0 
 1–3 
Final standings: Brazil 9 points, Colombia 4, Chile 2, Argentina 1.
 MLS Cup in Toronto, Ontario, Canada:
FC Dallas 1–2 Colorado Rapids (a.e.t.)
The Rapids win the Cup for the first time.

Golf
European Tour:
Hong Kong Open in Sheung Shui, Hong Kong:
Winner: Ian Poulter  258 (−22)
Poulter wins his tenth European Tour title.

Snooker
Players Tour Championship:
Euro Event 6 in Prague:
Final: Michael Holt  4–3 John Higgins 
Holt wins his first professional title.
Final Order of Merit: (1) Shaun Murphy  23,200 (2) Mark Selby  21,300 (3) Barry Pinches  19,100

Speed skating
World Cup 2 in Berlin, Germany:
1000 m women:  Christine Nesbitt  1:15.86  Heather Richardson  1:16.31  Margot Boer  1:16.51
Standings (after 2 of 8 races): (1) Nesbitt 200 points (2) Boer 150 (3) Richardson 130
1000 m men:  Shani Davis  1:08.82  Lee Kyu-Hyeok  1:09.08  Simon Kuipers  1:09.11
Standings (after 2 of 8 races): (1) Davis 200 points (2) Kuipers 140 (3) Stefan Groothuis  130
Team Pursuit women:   3:04.91   3:05.50   3:06.67
Team Pursuit men:   3:43.10   3:44.65   3:45.38

Tennis
ATP World Tour:
Barclays ATP World Tour Finals in London, United Kingdom, day 1:
Singles – Group B:
Andy Murray  [5] def. Robin Söderling  [4] 6–2, 6–4
Roger Federer  [2] def. David Ferrer  [7] 6–1, 6–4
Doubles – Group A:
Bob Bryan  / Mike Bryan  [1] def. Jürgen Melzer  / Philipp Petzschner  [8] 6–3, 7–5
Mariusz Fyrstenberg  / Marcin Matkowski  [6] def. Lukáš Dlouhý  / Leander Paes  [4] 6–3, 7–6(3)

November 20, 2010 (Saturday)

American football
NCAA (unbeaten teams in bold):
BCS Top 10:
(5) LSU 43, Ole Miss 36
The Big Game: (6) Stanford 48, California 14
(7) Wisconsin 48, Michigan 28
Michigan quarterback Denard Robinson becomes the first player in NCAA history to rush for 1,500 yards and pass for 1,500 yards in a season.
(19) Texas A&M 9, (8) Nebraska 6
(9) Ohio State 20, (20) Iowa 17
(10) Oklahoma State 48, Kansas 14
Played earlier this week: (4) Boise State
Idle: (1) Oregon, (2) Auburn, (3) TCU
Other games:
(13) Arkansas 38, (21) Mississippi State 31 (2OT)
(16) Virginia Tech 31, (24) Miami 17
The Hokies win the ACC Coastal Division title and book a place in the ACC Championship Game.
Northern Illinois 59, Ball State 21
The Huskies clinch the MAC West Division title and book a place in the MAC Championship Game.

Auto racing
Nationwide Series:
Ford 300 in Homestead, Florida: (1)  Kyle Busch (Toyota; Joe Gibbs Racing) (2)  Kevin Harvick (Chevrolet; Kevin Harvick Inc.) (3)  Brad Keselowski (Dodge; Penske Racing)
Final drivers' championship standings: (1) Keselowski 5639 points (2)  Carl Edwards (Ford; Roush Fenway Racing) 5194 (3) Busch 4934
V8 Supercars:
Norton 360 Sandown Challenge, Race 23 in Melbourne, Victoria: (1) Paul Dumbrell  (Ford Falcon) (2) Jamie Whincup  (Holden Commodore) (3) Mark Winterbottom  (Ford Falcon)
Drivers' championship standings (after 23 of 26 races): (1) James Courtney  (Ford Falcon) 2782 points (2) Whincup 2750 (3) Winterbottom 2591

Canadian football
CIS football:
National Semifinals:
Uteck Bowl: Laval Rouge et Or 13, Western Ontario Mustangs 11
Mitchell Bowl: Calgary Dinos 35, Saint Mary's Huskies 8

Cricket
Pakistan vs South Africa in UAE:
2nd Test in Abu Dhabi, day 1:  311/5 (90 overs; AB de Villiers 120*, Jacques Kallis 105); .
New Zealand in India:
3rd Test in Nagpur, day 1:  148/7 (56 overs); .

Cross-country skiing
World Cup in Gällivare, Sweden:
Men's 15 km Freestyle:  Marcus Hellner  32:26.0  Dario Cologna  32:37.4  Daniel Rickardsson  32:46.1
Women's 10 km Freestyle:  Marit Bjørgen  23:48.4  Charlotte Kalla  24:29.5  Arianna Follis  24:39.8

Equestrianism
Dressage:
Stuttgart German Masters in Stuttgart (CDI 5*):
Grand Prix Freestyle:  Isabell Werth  on Satchmo  Ulla Salzgeber  on Herzruf's Erbe  Hubertus Schmidt  on Dark Diamond
Four-in-hand driving:
FEI World Cup:
2nd competition in Stuttgart (CAI-W):  Boyd Exell   Koos de Ronde   IJsbrand Chardon 
Show jumping:
FEI World Cup North American League – West Coast:
11th competition in Burbank (CSI 2*-W):  Ashlee Bond  on Cadett  Richard Spooner  on Cristallo  Harley Brown  on Cassiato

Figure skating
ISU Grand Prix:
Rostelecom Cup in Moscow, Russia: (skaters in bold qualify for the Final)
Men:  Tomáš Verner  230.31  Patrick Chan  227.21  Jeremy Abbott  217.21
Standings (after 5 of 6 events): Daisuke Takahashi  30 points (2 events), Chan 28 (2), Verner, Nobunari Oda  26 (2), Abbott 24 (2), Adam Rippon  20 (2), Takahiko Kozuka  15 (1)... Brandon Mroz  13 (1), Florent Amodio , Armin Mahbanoozadeh  11 (1).
Pairs:  Yuko Kavaguti / Alexander Smirnov  182.70  Narumi Takahashi / Mervin Tran  55.90 165.47  Amanda Évora / Mark Ladwig  162.85
Standings (after 5 of 6 events): Pang Qing / Tong Jian  30 points (2 events), Kirsten Moore-Towers / Dylan Moscovitch  26 (2), Lubov Iliushechkina / Nodari Maisuradze , Sui Wenjing / Han Cong , Takahashi / Tran 24 (2), Caitlin Yankowskas / John Coughlin  20 (2)... Aliona Savchenko / Robin Szolkowy , Kavaguti / Smirnov 15 (1), Vera Bazarova / Yuri Larionov  13 (1).
Ladies:  Miki Ando  174.47  Akiko Suzuki  172.74  Ashley Wagner  167.02
Standings (after 5 of 6 events): Ando 30 points (2 events), Carolina Kostner , Kanako Murakami , Suzuki, Rachael Flatt  26 points (2 events), Wagner, Amélie Lacoste  18 (2)... Alissa Czisny  15 (1).
Ice Dancing:  Ekaterina Bobrova / Dmitri Soloviev  154.33  Nóra Hoffmann / Maxim Zavozin  142.09  Elena Ilinykh / Nikita Katsalapov  134.79
Standings (after 5 of 6 events): Meryl Davis / Charlie White  30 points (2 events), Vanessa Crone / Paul Poirier , Bobrova / Soloviev 28 (2), Kaitlyn Weaver / Andrew Poje , Hoffmann / Zavozin, Maia Shibutani / Alex Shibutani  22 (2)... Nathalie Péchalat / Fabian Bourzat  15 (1), Sinead Kerr / John Kerr  13 (1), Madison Chock / Greg Zuerlein  11 (1).

Football (soccer)
2011 FIFA Women's World Cup qualification:
UEFA-CONCACAF play-off, first leg in Parma:  0–1

Mixed martial arts
UFC 123 in Auburn Hills, Michigan:
Lightweight bout: George Sotiropoulos  def. Joe Lauzon  by submission (kimura)
Light Heavyweight bout: Phil Davis  def. Tim Boetsch  by submission (modified kimura)
Middleweight bout: Maiquel Falcão  def. Gerald Harris  by unanimous decision (29–27, 29–28, 29–28)
Welterweight bout: B.J. Penn  def. Matt Hughes  by knockout (punches)
Light Heavyweight bout: Quinton Jackson  def. Lyoto Machida  by split decision (28–29, 29–28, 29–28)

Rugby union
End of year tests:
Week 5:
 14–32  in Florence
 22–15  in Tbilisi
 26–13  in London
 21–17  in Edinburgh
 24–12  in Coimbra
 18–38  in Dublin
 15–9  in Montpellier

Snowboarding
World Cup in Stockholm, Sweden:
Big Air:  Sébastien Toutant   Petja Piiroinen   Patrick Burgener 
Standings (after 2 of 4 events): (1) Toutant 1220 points (2) Ståle Sandbech  1090 (3) Marko Grilc  1018
Overall: (1) Toutant 1220 points (2) Seppe Smits  1180 (3) Tore Viken Holvik  1150

Speed skating
World Cup 2 in Berlin, Germany:
500 m men:  Pekka Koskela  34.90  Tucker Fredricks  34.91  Lee Kang-Seok  35.13
Standings (after 4 of 12 races): (1) Joji Kato  330 points (2) Lee Kang-Seok 290 (3) Lee Kyu-Hyeok  235
500 m women:  Jenny Wolf  37.98  Margot Boer  38.46  Lee Sang-Hwa  38.56
Standings (after 4 of 12 races): (1) Wolf 400 points (2) Boer 300 (3) Lee 270
3000 m women:  Jilleanne Rookard  4:04.38  Martina Sáblíková  4:05.83  Stephanie Beckert  4:06.12
Standings (after 2 of 6 races): (1) Beckert 170 points (2) Rookard 140 (3) Kristina Groves  120
1500 m men:  Håvard Bøkko  1:45.27  Trevor Marsicano  1:46.15  Stefan Groothuis  1:46.31
Standings (after 2 of 6 races): (1) Shani Davis  140 points (2) Bøkko 132 (3) Groothuis 130

November 19, 2010 (Friday)

American football
NCAA BCS Top 10 (unbeaten team in bold):
Battle for the Milk Can: (4) Boise State 51, Fresno State 0

Baseball
Asian Games in Guangzhou, China:
Bronze medal match:  2–6  
Final:   9–3

Cricket
West Indies in Sri Lanka:
1st Test in Galle, day 5:  580/9d;  378 and 241/4 (f/o, 81.2 overs). Match drawn; 3-match series level 0–0.

Figure skating
ISU Grand Prix:
Rostelecom Cup in Moscow, Russia:
Men Short Program: (1) Patrick Chan  81.96 (2) Jeremy Abbott  77.61 (3) Tomáš Verner  74.10
Pairs Short Program: (1) Yuko Kavaguti / Alexander Smirnov  61.91 (2) Narumi Takahashi / Mervin Tran  55.90 (3) Katarina Gerboldt / Alexander Enbert  53.62
Ladies Short Program: (1) Akiko Suzuki  57.43 (2) Agnes Zawadzki  56.84 (3) Ashley Wagner  56.17
Ice Dance Short Dance: (1) Ekaterina Bobrova / Dmitri Soloviev  60.80 (2) Federica Faiella / Massimo Scali  57.65 (3) Nóra Hoffmann / Maxim Zavozin  57.24

Football (soccer)
Sudamericano Femenino in Ecuador: (teams in bold qualify for the 2011 FIFA Women's World Cup)
Second stage:
 0–0 
 5–0 
Standings (after 2 matches): Brazil 6 points, Chile 2, Argentina 1, Colombia  1.

Rugby union
End of year tests:
Week 5:
 9–16  in Biella
 25–0  in Galashiels
 16–16  in Cardiff

Speed skating
World Cup 2 in Berlin, Germany:
500 m women:  Jenny Wolf  38.08  Lee Sang-Hwa  38.24  Margot Boer  38.66
Standings (after 3 of 12 races): (1) Wolf 300 points (2) Boer 220 (3) Lee 200
500 m men:  Joji Kato  35.03  Jan Smeekens  35.04  Lee Kang-Seok  35.10
Standings (after 3 of 12 races): (1) Kato 280 points (2) Lee 220 (3) Keiichiro Nagashima  181
1500 m women:  Christine Nesbitt  1:57.03  Ida Njåtun  1:57.99  Ireen Wüst  1:58.93
Standings (after 2 of 6 races): (1) Nesbitt 200 points (2) Wüst 150 (3) Cindy Klassen  120
5000 m men:  Lee Seung-Hoon  6:18.40  Jonathan Kuck  6:18.85  Håvard Bøkko  6:19.50
Standings (after 2 of 6 races): (1) Bob de Jong  160 points (2) Lee 140 (3) Kuck 140

November 18, 2010 (Thursday)

American football
NFL Thursday Night Football, Week 11: Chicago Bears 16, Miami Dolphins 0

Baseball
Major League Baseball awards:
American League Cy Young Award: Félix Hernández, Seattle Mariners

Basketball
Euroleague:
Regular Season, matchday 5:
Group A:
Žalgiris Kaunas  73–65  Khimki Moscow
Maccabi Tel Aviv  99–58  Asseco Prokom Gdynia
Group B: Brose Baskets  65–69  Unicaja Málaga
Group D:
Efes Pilsen Istanbul  86–72  CSKA Moscow
Armani Jeans Milano  71–81  Panathinaikos Athens

Cricket
West Indies in Sri Lanka:
1st Test in Galle, day 4:  580/9d;  378 (95.2 overs) and 89/0 (f/o, 22 overs). Sri Lanka trail by 113 runs with 10 wickets remaining.

Football (soccer)
Copa Sudamericana Semifinals, first leg:
LDU Quito  2–3  Independiente

Snooker
Premier League week 10 in Llandudno: (players in bold advance to the semi-finals)
Ronnie O'Sullivan  5–1 Mark Selby 
Shaun Murphy  2–4 Neil Robertson 
Final standings: O'Sullivan 9 points, Marco Fu  8, Murphy 6, Robertson, Mark Williams , Selby 5, Ding Junhui  4.

November 17, 2010 (Wednesday)

Baseball
Major League Baseball awards:
Manager of the Year:
American League: Ron Gardenhire, Minnesota Twins
National League: Bud Black, San Diego Padres

Basketball
Euroleague:
Regular Season, matchday 5:
Group A: Partizan Belgrade  74–71  Caja Laboral
Group B:
Spirou Basket  67–49  Real Madrid
Virtus Roma  71–86  Olympiacos Piraeus
Group C:
Lietuvos Rytas  90–62  KK Cibona Zagreb
Cholet Basket  82–78  Fenerbahçe Ülker
Montepaschi Siena  76–67  Regal FC Barcelona
Group D: Union Olimpija Ljubljana  72–68  Power Electronics Valencia

Cricket
West Indies in Sri Lanka:
1st Test in Galle, day 3:  580/9d;  165/3 (43.1 overs). Sri Lanka trail by 415 runs with 7 wickets remaining in the 1st innings.

Football (soccer)
Sudamericano Femenino in Ecuador:
Second stage:
 1–1 
 4–0 
UEFA Euro 2012 qualifying:
Group E:  8–0 
Standings:  12 points (4 matches),  9 (4),  6 (3),  6 (4), Finland 3 (4), San Marino 0 (5).
Group F:  3–0 
Standings (after 4 matches): Croatia 10 points,  8,  6,  4, Malta 0.
Africa Cup of Nations qualification:
Group K:
 1–0 
 0–0 
Standings: Botswana 13 points (5 matches), Tunisia 7 (5),  6 (4), Togo 3 (5), Chad 2 (5).
Friendly international matches (selected):
 0–2 
 1–0  in Doha, Qatar
 3–0 
 1–2 
 1–0 
 1–1  in Klagenfurt, Austria
 0–0 
 1–2 
 1–2 
 1–2 
 4–0 
 2–0 
Copa Sudamericana Semifinals, first leg:
Goiás  0–1  Palmeiras

November 16, 2010 (Tuesday)

Baseball
Major League Baseball awards:
National League Cy Young Award: Roy Halladay, Philadelphia Phillies
Halladay, the unanimous winner, becomes the fifth pitcher to win the Cy Young Award in both the National and American Leagues.

Cricket
Pakistan vs South Africa in UAE:
1st Test in Dubai, day 5:  380 and 318/2d;  248 and 343/3 (117 overs; Younis Khan 131*). Match drawn; 2-match series level 0–0.
New Zealand in India:
2nd Test in Hyderabad, day 5:  350 and 448/8d (135 overs; Brendon McCullum 225);  472 and 68/0 (17 overs). Match drawn; 3-match series level 0–0.
West Indies in Sri Lanka:
1st Test in Galle, day 2:  580/9d (163.2 overs; Chris Gayle 333, Ajantha Mendis 6/169);  54/1 (12.2 overs). Sri Lanka trail by 526 runs with 9 wickets remaining in the 1st innings.
Gayle becomes the fourth batsman to score multiple triple hundreds in Test cricket, after Donald Bradman, Brian Lara and Virender Sehwag.

Rugby union
End of year tests:
Week 5:
Munster  15–6  in Limerick

Table tennis
Asian Games in Guangzhou, China:
Men's Team Final:   3–0  
Women's Team Final:   3–0

Tennis
Asian Games in Guangzhou, China:
Men's Team Final:   2–1  
Women's Team Final:   2–1

November 15, 2010 (Monday)

American football
NFL Monday Night Football, Week 10: Philadelphia Eagles 59, Washington Redskins 28
Eagles quarterback Michael Vick becomes the first quarterback to pass for at least 300 yards and four touchdowns, and rush for 50 yards and two touchdowns in a game. Vick also moves into second place for rushing yards by a quarterback, passing Steve Young.

Badminton
Asian Games in Guangzhou, China:
Men's Team Final:   3–1  
Women's Team Final:   3–0

Baseball
Major League Baseball awards:
Rookies of the Year:
American League: Neftalí Feliz, Texas Rangers
National League: Buster Posey, San Francisco Giants

Cricket
Pakistan vs South Africa in UAE:
1st Test in Dubai, day 4:  380 and 318/2d (95 overs; Jacques Kallis 135*, Hashim Amla 118*);  248 and 109/2 (41 overs). Pakistan require another 342 runs with 8 wickets remaining.
New Zealand in India:
2nd Test in Hyderabad, day 4:  350 and 237/4 (75 overs; Brendon McCullum 124*);  472 (143.4 overs; Harbhajan Singh 111*, Daniel Vettori 5/135). New Zealand lead by 115 runs with 6 wickets remaining.
West Indies in Sri Lanka:
1st Test in Galle, day 1:  362/2 (90 overs; Chris Gayle 219*); .

Golf
European Tour:
Barclays Singapore Open in Singapore:
Winner: Adam Scott  267 (−17)
Scott wins the tournament for the third time and his seventh European Tour title.

November 14, 2010 (Sunday)

Alpine skiing
Men's World Cup:
Slalom in Levi, Finland:  Jean-Baptiste Grange  1:46.64  André Myhrer  1:46.97  Ivica Kostelić  1:47.61

American football
NFL Week 10:
Buffalo Bills 14, Detroit Lions 12
Chicago Bears 27, Minnesota Vikings 13
New York Jets 26, Cleveland Browns 20 (OT)
Indianapolis Colts 23, Cincinnati Bengals 17
Miami Dolphins 29, Tennessee Titans 17
Tampa Bay Buccaneers 31, Carolina Panthers 16
Jacksonville Jaguars 31, Houston Texans 24
Denver Broncos 49, Kansas City Chiefs 29
Dallas Cowboys 33, New York Giants 20
Seattle Seahawks 36, Arizona Cardinals 18
San Francisco 49ers 23, St. Louis Rams 20 (OT)
Sunday Night Football: New England Patriots 39, Pittsburgh Steelers 26
Byes: Green Bay Packers, New Orleans Saints, Oakland Raiders, San Diego Chargers

Auto racing
Formula One:
 in Abu Dhabi: (1) Sebastian Vettel  (Red Bull–Renault) (2) Lewis Hamilton  (McLaren–Mercedes) (3) Jenson Button  (McLaren-Mercedes)
Final drivers' championship standings: (1) Vettel 256 points (2) Fernando Alonso  (Ferrari) 252 (3) Mark Webber  (Red Bull-Renault) 242
Final constructors' championship standings: (1) Red Bull 498 points (2) McLaren 454 (3) Ferrari 396
Chase for the Sprint Cup:
Kobalt Tools 500 in Avondale: (1)  Carl Edwards (Ford; Roush Fenway Racing) (2)  Ryan Newman (Chevrolet; Stewart Haas Racing) (3)  Joey Logano (Toyota; Joe Gibbs Racing)
Drivers' championship standings (after 35 of 36 races): (1)  Denny Hamlin (Toyota; Joe Gibbs Racing) 6462 points (2)  Jimmie Johnson (Chevrolet; Hendrick Motorsports) 6447 (3)  Kevin Harvick (Chevrolet; Richard Childress Racing) 6416
World Rally Championship:
Wales Rally GB in Cardiff: (1) Sébastien Loeb /Daniel Elena  (Citroën C4 WRC) (2) Petter Solberg /Chris Patterson  (Citroën C4 WRC) (3) Jari-Matti Latvala /Miikka Anttila  (Ford Focus RS WRC 09)
Final drivers' championship standings: (1) Loeb 276 points (2) Latvala 171 (3) Solberg 169
V8 Supercars:
Falken Tasmania Challenge, Race 22 in Launceston, Tasmania: (1) Mark Winterbottom  (Ford Falcon) (2) Paul Dumbrell  (Ford Falcon) (3) Jason Bright  (Holden Commodore)
Drivers' championship standings (after 22 of 26 races): (1) James Courtney  (Ford Falcon) 2662 points (2) Jamie Whincup  (Holden Commodore) 2612 (3) Winterbottom 2462

Canadian football
CFL Playoffs:
Division Semifinals:
East in Hamilton, Ontario: Toronto Argonauts 16, Hamilton Tiger-Cats 13
West in Regina, Saskatchewan: Saskatchewan Roughriders 41, BC Lions 38 (2OT)

Cricket
Pakistan vs South Africa in UAE:
1st Test in Dubai, day 3:  380 and 139/2 (48 overs);  248 (95 overs; Morné Morkel 5/54). South Africa lead by 271 runs with 8 wickets remaining.
New Zealand in India:
2nd Test in Hyderabad, day 3:  350;  436/9 (134 overs). India lead by 86 runs with 1 wicket remaining in the 1st innings.

Equestrianism
Show jumping:
FEI World Cup Central European League – North Sub-League:
6th competition in Leszno (CSI 3*-W):  Jannike West  on Vivaldi K  Arne van Heel  on Zeitzeuge  Thomas Kleis  on Crocant
FEI World Cup South American League:
5th competition in Capilla del Señor (CSIO 4*-W):  Leandro Moschini  on Gama Zarello  Carlos Milthaler  on As Hyo Altanero  Ricardo Dircie  on Llavaneras H.J. Aries

Figure skating
ISU Grand Prix:
Skate America in Portland, Oregon: (skaters in bold qualify for the Final)
Ice Dance:  Meryl Davis / Charlie White  156.68  Vanessa Crone / Paul Poirier  149.08  Maia Shibutani / Alex Shibutani  144.81
Standings (after 4 of 6 events): Davis / White 30 points (2 events), Crone / Poirier 28 (2), Kaitlyn Weaver / Andrew Poje , Shibutani / Shibutani 22 (2), Nathalie Péchalat / Fabian Bourzat  15 (1), Sinead Kerr / John Kerr , Ekaterina Bobrova / Dmitri Soloviev  13 (1), Federica Faiella / Massimo Scali , Madison Chock / Greg Zuerlein  11 (1).
Ladies:  Kanako Murakami  164.93  Rachael Flatt  162.86  Carolina Kostner  154.87
Standings (after 4 of 6 events): Kostner, Murakami, Flatt 26 points (2 events), Amélie Lacoste  18 (2), Alissa Czisny , Miki Ando  15 (1), Ksenia Makarova , Akiko Suzuki  13 (1)... Alena Leonova  11 (1).

Football (soccer)
African Women's Championship in Daveyton, South Africa:
3rd place playoff:  0–2  
Final:   4–2  
Nigeria win the title for the eighth time from nine tournaments.
Caribbean Championship Qualifying Group Stage Two: (teams in bold advance to the final tournament)
Group G in St. John's, Antigua and Barbuda:
 0–5 
 0–0 
Final standings: Cuba, Antigua and Barbuda 5 points, Suriname 4, Dominica 1.
CAF Confederation Cup Semifinals, second leg: (first leg score in parentheses)
Al-Hilal  1–0 (0–1)  CS Sfaxien. 1–1 on aggregate; Sfaxien win 5–3 on penalties.
OFC Champions League Group stage, matchday 2:
Group B: Waitakere United  1–1  Auckland City FC
Standings (after 2 matches): Auckland City, Waitakere United 4 points,  AS Magenta 3 (2),  AS Tefana 0 (2).
 Russian Premier League, matchday 28 of 30: (teams in bold qualify for the Champions League, team in italics qualify for the Europa League)
Zenit St. Petersburg 5–0 Rostov
Spartak Nalchik 1–1 CSKA Moscow
Standings: Zenit 66 points, CSKA Moscow 58, Rubin Kazan 56, Spartak Moscow 48.
Zenit win the championship for the second time.
 Singapore Cup Final in Singapore:
Tampines Rovers  0–1  Bangkok Glass
 FAI Cup Final in Dublin:
Sligo Rovers 0–0 (2–0 pen.) Shamrock Rovers
Sligo Rovers win the Cup for the third time.
 Norwegian Cup Final in Oslo:
Follo 0–2 Strømsgodset
Strømsgodset win the Cup for the fifth time.
 MLS Cup Playoffs:
Western Conference Final in Carson, California:
Los Angeles Galaxy 0–3 FC Dallas

Golf
PGA Tour Fall Series:
Children's Miracle Network Classic in Lake Buena Vista, Florida:
Winner: Robert Garrigus  267 (−21)
Garrigus wins his first PGA Tour title.
European Tour:
Barclays Singapore Open in Singapore: Play will conclude on November 15 due to thunderstorms.
LPGA Tour:
Lorena Ochoa Invitational in Guadalajara, Mexico:
Winner: In-Kyung Kim  269 (−19)
Kim wins her third LPGA Tour title.

Snooker
Players Tour Championship:
Euro Event 5 in Hamm, Germany:
Final: John Higgins  4–2 Shaun Murphy 
Higgins wins his first tournament since his return from a six-month suspension following match-fixing allegations and 33rd professional title of his career.
Order of Merit (after 11 of 12 events): (1) Murphy 20,700 (2) Mark Selby  19,900 (3) Barry Pinches  18,900

Speed skating
World Cup 1 in Heerenveen, Netherlands:
500 m Men:  Keiichiro Nagashima  34.97  Joji Kato  35.01  Lee Kang-Seok  35.10
Standings (after 2 of 12 races): (1) Kato 180 points (2) Lee 150 (3) Nagashima 136.
1500 m Ladies:  Christine Nesbitt  1:56.00  Ireen Wüst  1:57.35  Marrit Leenstra  1:57.68
5000 m Men:  Bob de Jong  6:17.31  Ivan Skobrev  6:18.96  Wouter olde Heuvel  6:20.93

Tennis
ATP World Tour:
BNP Paribas Masters in Paris, France:
Final: Robin Söderling  def. Gaël Monfils  7–6(1), 6–1
Söderling wins his first Masters 1000 title, and the sixth title of his career.

Volleyball
Women's World Championship in Tokyo, Japan:
11th place playoff:  3–0 
9th place playoff:  3–0 
7th place playoff:  1–3 
5th place playoff:  3–0 
3rd place playoff:  2–3  
Final:   3–2  
Russia win the title for the second straight time.
Most Valuable Player: Yekaterina Gamova

November 13, 2010 (Saturday)

Alpine skiing
Women's World Cup:
Slalom in Levi, Finland:  Marlies Schild  1:52.84  Maria Riesch  1:52.87  Tanja Poutiainen  1:53.18
Overall standings (after 2 of 38 races): (1) Riesch 125 points (2) Poutiainen 110 (3) Schild and Viktoria Rebensburg  100

American football
NCAA (unbeaten teams in bold):
BCS Top 10:
(1) Oregon 15, California 13
Deep South's Oldest Rivalry: (2) Auburn 49, Georgia 31
The Tigers win the SEC West Division title and book a trip to Atlanta for the SEC Championship Game.
(3) TCU 40, San Diego State 35
(5) LSU 51, Louisiana–Monroe 0
(6) Stanford 17, Arizona State 13
(7) Wisconsin 83, Indiana 20
(8) Nebraska 20, Kansas 3
(9) Ohio State 38, Penn State 14
(10) Oklahoma State 33, Texas 16
Played earlier this week: (4) Boise State
Other games:
(12) Alabama 30, (19) Mississippi State 10
Northwestern 21, (13) Iowa 17
Notre Dame 28, (14) Utah 3
(17) Missouri 38, (24) Kansas State 28
(23) South Carolina 36, (22) Florida 14
The Gamecocks win the SEC East for the first time, earning a date against Auburn in the SEC Championship Game.

Auto racing
Nationwide Series:
WYPALL* 200 Powered by Kimberly-Clark Professional in Avondale: (1)  Carl Edwards (Ford; Roush Fenway Racing) (2)  Kevin Harvick (Chevrolet; Kevin Harvick Inc.) (3)  Joey Logano (Toyota; Joe Gibbs Racing)
Drivers' championship standings (after 34 of 35 races): (1)  Brad Keselowski (Dodge; Penske Racing) 5474 points (2) Edwards 5044 (3)  Kyle Busch (Toyota; Joe Gibbs Racing) 4739
V8 Supercars:
Falken Tasmania Challenge, Race 21 in Launceston, Tasmania: (1) Craig Lowndes  (Holden Commodore) (2) Garth Tander  (Holden Commodore) (3) Greg Murphy  (Holden Commodore)
Drivers' championship standings (after 21 of 26 races): (1) James Courtney  (Ford Falcon) 2593 points (2) Jamie Whincup  (Holden Commodore) 2552 (3) Lowndes 2405

Cricket
Pakistan vs South Africa in UAE:
1st Test in Dubai, day 2:  380 (123 overs);  144/2 (55 overs). Pakistan trail by 236 runs with 8 wickets remaining in the 1st innings.
New Zealand in India:
2nd Test in Hyderabad, day 2:  350 (117.3 overs);  178/2 (49 overs). India trail by 172 runs with 8 wickets remaining in the 1st innings.

Equestrianism
Show jumping:
FEI World Cup North American League – West Coast:
10th competition in Rancho Murieta (CSI 3*-W):  Harley Brown  on Cassiato  Helen McNaught  on Caballo  Mark Watring  on Green Sleeps Vioco

Fencing
World Championships in Paris, France:
Men's team épée:   (Jean-Michel Lucenay, Ulrich Robeiri, Gauthier Grumier, Jérôme Jeannet)   (Benjamin Bratton, Weston Kelsey, Cody Mattern, Benjamin (Benji) Ungar)   (Gábor Boczkó, András Rédli, Géza Imre, Péter Somfai)

Figure skating
ISU Grand Prix:
Skate America in Portland, Oregon: (skaters in bold qualify for the Final)
Ladies Short Program: (1) Carolina Kostner  60.28 (2) Kanako Murakami  54.75 (3) Joshi Helgesson  51.17
Short Dance: (1) Meryl Davis / Charlie White  63.62 (2) Vanessa Crone / Paul Poirier  60.41 (3) Kaitlyn Weaver / Andrew Poje  59.48
Men:  Daisuke Takahashi  227.07  Nobunari Oda  226.09  Armin Mahbanoozadeh  211.17
Standings (after 4 of 6 events): Takahashi 30 points (2 events), Oda 26 (2), Adam Rippon  20 (2), Patrick Chan , Takahiko Kozuka  15 (1), Jeremy Abbott , Brandon Mroz  13 (1), Tomáš Verner , Florent Amodio , Mahbanoozadeh 11 (1).
Pairs:  Aliona Savchenko / Robin Szolkowy  197.70  Kirsten Moore-Towers / Dylan Moscovitch  175.48  Sui Wenjing / Han Cong  170.07
Standings (after 4 of 6 events): Pang Qing / Tong Jian  30 points (2 events), Moore-Towers / Moscovitch 26 (2), Lubov Iliushechkina / Nodari Maisuradze , Sui / Han 24 (2), Caitlin Yankowskas / John Coughlin  20 (2)... Savchenko / Szolkowy 15 (1), Vera Bazarova / Yuri Larionov  13 (1), Paige Lawrence / Rudi Swiegers , Narumi Takahashi / Mervin Tran  11 (1).

Football (soccer)
Sudamericano Femenino in Ecuador: (teams in bold advance to the second round)
Group B:
 0–8 
 3–0 
Final standings: Brazil 12 points, Colombia 9, Paraguay 6,  3, Uruguay 0.
AFC Champions League Final, in Tokyo:
Seongnam Ilhwa Chunma  3–1  Zob Ahan
Seongnam win the title for the second time, and qualify for the FIFA Club World Cup.
CAF Champions League Final, second leg: (first leg score in parentheses)
Espérance ST  1–1 (0–5)  TP Mazembe. TP Mazembe win 6–1 on aggregate.
TP Mazembe win the title for the second successive time and fourth overall, and qualify for the FIFA Club World Cup.
OFC Champions League Group stage, matchday 2:
Group A:
Lautoka  1–0  Amical
PRK Hekari United  4–0  Koloale
Standings (after 2 matches): Lautoka 6 points, PRK Hekari United, Amical 3, Koloale 0.
Group B: AS Magenta  1–0  AS Tefana
Standings:  Auckland City,  Waitakere United 3 points (1 match), AS Magenta 3 (2), AS Tefana 0 (2).
 MLS Cup Playoffs:
Eastern Conference Final in Commerce City, Colorado:
Colorado Rapids 1–0 San Jose Earthquakes
 Belarusian Premier League, matchday 32 of 33: (team in bold qualify for the Champions League, team in italics qualify for the Europa League)
Belshina 1–3 BATE
Shakhtyor 0–1 Neman Grodno
Standings: BATE 72 points, Shakhtyor 63, Minsk 57, Dinamo Minsk 56.
BATE win their fifth successive title and seventh in total.

Gymnastics
Trampoline World Championships in Metz, France:
Double Mini Women:  Corissa Boychuk  70.500  Bianca Budler  70.300  Svetlana Balandina  70.200
Tumbling Men:  Viktor Kyforenko  76.300  Yang Song  75.400  Andrey Krylov  74.600
Synchro Men:   (Tu Xiao, Đông Đông) 53.800   (Sebastien Martiny, Gregoire Pennes) 51.700   (Tetsuya Sotomura, Masaki Ito) 51.300
Trampoline Women:  Li Dan  40.300  Huang Shanshan  39.800  Rosannagh MacLennan  39.300

Mixed martial arts
UFC 122 in Oberhausen, Germany:
Welterweight bout: Duane Ludwig  def. Nick Osipczak  via split decision (28–30, 29–28, 29–28).
Light Heavyweight bout: Krzysztof Soszynski  def. Goran Reljic  via unanimous decision (30–27, 30–27, 30–27).
Welterweight bout: Amir Sadollah  def. Peter Sobotta  via unanimous decision (30–27, 30–27, 30–27).
Lightweight bout: Dennis Siver  def. Andre Winner  via submission (rear-naked choke) at 3:37 of round 1.
Middleweight bout: Yushin Okami  def. Nate Marquardt  via unanimous decision (29–28, 29–28, 30–27).

Rugby league
Four Nations Final in Brisbane:  12–16 
New Zealand win the title for the second time (previously as Tri-Nations).

Rugby union
2011 Rugby World Cup qualifying:
Final Place Play-off Qualification Final, first leg in Montevideo:  21–21 
End of year tests:
Week 4:
 16–22  in Verona
 35–18  in London
 20–10  in Dublin
 25–29  in Cardiff
 17–22  in Lisbon
 22–60  in Madrid
 34–12  in Nantes
 3–49  in Edinburgh

Speed skating
World Cup 1 in Heerenveen, Netherlands:
500 m Ladies:  Jenny Wolf  38.17  Margot Boer  38.54  Nao Kodaira  38.77
Standings (after 2 of 12 races): (1) Wolf 200 points (2) Boer 150 (3) Kodaira 130
3000 m Ladies:  Stephanie Beckert  4:04.38  Cindy Klassen  4:07.19  Kristina Groves  4:08.01
1500 m Men:  Shani Davis  1:45.04  Simon Kuipers  1:45.48  Mark Tuitert  1:45.95

Volleyball
Women's World Championship in Tokyo, Japan:
9th–12th places semifinals:
 3–2 
 1–3 
5th–8th places semifinals:
 2–3 
 0–3 
Semifinals:
 3–1 
 3–2

November 12, 2010 (Friday)

American football
NCAA BCS Top 10 (unbeaten team in bold):
(4) Boise State 52, Idaho 14

Cricket
Pakistan vs South Africa in UAE:
1st Test in Dubai, day 1:  311/3 (89.3 overs; Graeme Smith 100); .
New Zealand in India:
2nd Test in Hyderabad, day 1:  258/4 (90 overs; Tim McIntosh 102); .

Equestrianism
Show jumping:
FEI Nations Cup Promotional League – North and South America:
2nd competition in Capilla del Señor (CSIO 4*-W):       I
Standings (after 2 of 3 competitions): (1) Canada 11 points (2) Argentina 4 (3)  3

Fencing
World Championships in Paris, France:
Women's team épée:   (Anca Măroiu, Simona Alexandru, Ana Maria Brânză, Loredana Iordăchioiu)   (Britta Heidemann, Imke Duplitzer, Monika Sozanska, Ricarda Multerer)   (Shin A-Lam, Jung Hyo-Jung, Oh Yun-Hee, Park Se-Ra)

Figure skating
ISU Grand Prix:
Skate America in Portland, Oregon:
Pairs Short Program: (1) Aliona Savchenko / Robin Szolkowy  63.99 (2) Kirsten Moore-Towers / Dylan Moscovitch  61.64 (3) Caydee Denney / Jeremy Barrett  58.49
Men's Short Program: (1) Nobunari Oda  79.28 (2) Daisuke Takahashi  78.12 (3) Adam Rippon  73.94

Football (soccer)
Sudamericano Femenino in Ecuador: (teams in bold advance to the second round)
Group A:
 2–1 
 1–0 
Final standings: Argentina, Ecuador 9 points, Bolivia 3, Peru 0.
Caribbean Championship Qualifying Group Stage Two:
Group G in St. John's, Antigua and Barbuda:
 3–3 
 0–0 
Standing (after 2 matches): Cuba, Antigua and Barbuda 4 points, Suriname, Dominica 1.
CAF Confederation Cup Semi-finals, second leg: (first leg score in parentheses)
FUS Rabat  0–1 (2–1)  Ittihad. 2–2 on aggregate; FUS Rabat win on away goals rule.

Gymnastics
Trampoline World Championships in Metz, France:
Double Mini Men:  Andre Lico  73.400  Austin White  73.000  Evgeny Chernoivanov  72.700
Tumbling Women:  Anna Korobeynikova  68.200  Elena Krasnokutskaya  65.500  Marine Debauve  63.400
Synchro Women:   (Irina Karavayeva, Victoria Voronina) 47.500   (Carina Baumgartner, Anna Dogonadze) 46.800   (Tatsiana Piatrenia, Katsiaryna Mironava) 46.800
Trampoline Men:  Dong Dong  43.100  Ye Shuai  43.100  Yasuhiro Ueyama  42.400

Speed skating
World Cup 1 in Heerenveen, Netherlands:
500 m Men:  Joji Kato  34.85  Lee Kang-Seok  35.00  Lee Kyu-Hyeok  35.01
500 m Ladies:  Jenny Wolf  38.02  Lee Sang-Hwa  38.30  Margot Boer  38.39
1000 m Ladies:  Christine Nesbitt  1:15.84  Margot Boer  1:16.50  Ireen Wüst  1:16.75
1000 m Men:  Shani Davis  1:08.40  Stefan Groothuis  1:08.51  Simon Kuipers  1:08.68

November 11, 2010 (Thursday)

American football
NFL Thursday Night Football, Week 10: Atlanta Falcons 26, Baltimore Ravens 21

Basketball
Euroleague:
Regular Season, matchday 4:
Group A: Khimki Moscow  76–78  Maccabi Tel Aviv
Group B: Real Madrid  83–81 (OT)  Brose Baskets
Group C:
KK Cibona Zagreb  71–84  Cholet Basket
Regal FC Barcelona  69–55  Lietuvos Rytas
Group D:
Power Electronics Valencia  69–80  Armani Jeans Milano
Panathinaikos Athens  84–61  Efes Pilsen Istanbul

Fencing
World Championships in Paris, France:
Men's team foil:   (Huang Liangcai, Lei Sheng, Zhu Jun, Zhang Liangliang)   (Valerio Aspromonte, Andrea Cassarà, Andrea Baldini, Stefano Barrera)   (Suguru Awaji, Kenta Chida, Yuki Ota, Ryo Miyake)

Football (soccer)
African Women's Championship in Daveyton, South Africa:
Semifinals: (the winners qualify for 2011 FIFA Women's World Cup)
 5–1 
 3–1 (a.e.t.) 
Sudamericano Femenino in Ecuador:
Group B:
 5–2 
 1–2 
Standings: Brazil 9 points (3 matches), Colombia,  6 (3), Venezuela 3 (4), Uruguay 0 (3).
Copa Sudamericana Quarterfinals, second leg: (first leg score in parentheses)
Independiente  0–0 (2–2)  Deportes Tolima. 2–2 on points, 2–2 on aggregate; Independiente win on away goals rule.
Avaí  0–1 (2–2)  Goiás. Goiás win 4–1 on points.
UEFA Women's Champions League Round of 16, second leg: (first leg score in parentheses)
Arsenal  4–1 (0–2)  Rayo Vallecano. Arsenal win 4–3 on aggregate.
Everton  1–1 (4–1)  Brøndby. Everton win 5–2 on aggregate.

Snooker
Premier League week 9 in Grimsby: (players in bold advance to the semi-finals, player in strike is eliminated)
Shaun Murphy  4–2 Mark Williams 
Ronnie O'Sullivan  5–1 Neil Robertson 
Standings: Marco Fu  8 points (6 matches), O'Sullivan 7 (5), Murphy 6 (5), Williams 5 (6), Mark Selby  5 (5), Ding Junhui  4 (6), Robertson 3 (5).

November 10, 2010 (Wednesday)

Basketball
Euroleague:
Regular Season, matchday 4 (unbeaten team in bold):
Group A:
Asseco Prokom Gdynia  62–69  Partizan Belgrade
Caja Laboral  88–92  Žalgiris Kaunas
Group B:
Olympiacos Piraeus  86–78  Spirou Basket
Unicaja Málaga  104–83  Virtus Roma
Group C: Fenerbahçe Ülker  81–68  Montepaschi Siena
Group D: CSKA Moscow  65–55  Union Olimpija Ljubljana

Equestrianism
Show jumping:
FEI World Cup North American League – East Coast:
10th competition in Toronto (CSI 4*-W):  Brianne Goutal  on Ballade van het Indihoff  Harrie Smolders  on Regina Z  Robert Whitaker  on Omelli

Fencing
World Championships in Paris, France:
Women's team foil:   (Elisa Di Francisca, Arianna Errigo, Valentina Vezzali, Ilaria Salvatori)   (Karolina Chlewińska, Anna Rybicka, Sylwia Gruchała, Katarzyna Kryczalo)   (Seo Mi-Jung, Nam Hyun-Hee, Jeon Hee-Sook, Oh Ha Na)

Football (soccer)
Sudamericano Femenino in Ecuador: (teams in bold advance to the second round)
Group A:
 1–3 
 3–4 
Standings:  9 points (3 matches), Chile 9 (4), Ecuador 6 (3), Peru, Bolivia 0 (3).
Caribbean Championship Qualifying Group Stage Two:
Group G in St. John's, Antigua and Barbuda:
 4–2 
 2–1 
Copa Sudamericana Quarterfinals, second leg: (first leg score in parentheses)
LDU Quito  1–0 (0–0)  Newell's Old Boys. Quito win 4–1 on points.
Palmeiras  2–0 (1–1)  Atlético Mineiro. Palmeiras win 4–1 on points.
UEFA Women's Champions League Round of 16, second leg: (first leg score in parentheses)
Sparta Praha  0–1 (0–2)  Linköping. Linköping win 3–0 on aggregate.
Zvezda 2005 Perm  4–0 (1–1)  Røa. Zvezda 2005 Perm win 5–1 on aggregate.
Lyon  5–0 (6–1)  Rossiyanka. Lyon win 11–1 on aggregate.
Fortuna Hjørring  0–3 (2–4)  Duisburg. Duisburg win 7–2 on aggregate.
Neulengbach  0–9 (0–7)  Turbine Potsdam. Potsdam win 16–0 on aggregate.
Juvisy  2–2 (a.e.t.) (2–1)  Torres. Juvisy win 4–3 on aggregate.

Volleyball
Women's World Championship in Japan: (teams in bold advance to the semifinals)
Pool E in Tokyo:
 0–3 
 3–0 
 3–1 
 1–3 
Final standings: Russia 14 points, Japan 12, Serbia 11, Turkey, Poland, China, South Korea 10, Peru 7.
Pool F in Nagoya:
 1–3 
 3–1 
 1–3 
 2–3 
Final standings: Brazil 14 points, United States 12, Germany, Italy 11, Cuba 10, Netherlands, Thailand 9, Czech Republic 8.

November 9, 2010 (Tuesday)

Fencing
World Championships in Paris, France:
Men's team sabre:   (Nikolay Kovalev, Veniamin Reshetnikov, Aleksey Yakimenko, Artem Zanin)   (Diego Occhuizzi, Aldo Montano, Luigi Tarantino, Luigi Samele)   (Tiberiu Dolniceanu, Rareș Dumitrescu, Cosmin Hănceanu, Gelu Florin Zalomir)
Women's team sabre:   (Dina Galiakbarova, Yuliya Gavrilova, Sofiya Velikaya, Svetlana Kormilitsyna)   (Halyna Pundyk, Olha Kharlan, Olena Khomrova, Olha Zhovnir)   (Cécilia Berder, Carole Vergne, Léonore Perrus, Solenne Mary)

Football (soccer)
Sudamericano Femenino in Ecuador:
Group B:
 5–0 
 4–0 
Standings: , Colombia 6 points (2 matches), Paraguay 6 (3), Uruguay 0 (2), Venezuela 0 (3).

Rugby union
End of year tests:
Week 4:
Saracens  20–6  in London
Leicester Tigers  15–26  in Leicester
Connacht  26–22  in Galway

Volleyball
Women's World Championship in Japan: (teams in bold advance to the semifinals)
Pool E in Tokyo:
 0–3 
 0–3 
 0–3 
 3–0 
Standings (after 6 matches): Russia 12 points, Japan 11, Turkey, South Korea, Serbia 9, Poland, China 8, Peru 6.
Pool F in Nagoya:
 1–3 
 3–0 
 3–0 
 0–3 
Standings (after 6 matches): Brazil 12 points, United States 11, Italy 10, Germany 9, Netherlands, Cuba 8, Czech Republic, Thailand 7.

November 8, 2010 (Monday)

American football
NFL Monday Night Football, Week 9: Pittsburgh Steelers 27, Cincinnati Bengals 21
The Dallas Cowboys fire head coach Wade Phillips and name Jason Garrett as interim replacement. (CBC)

Cricket
Pakistan vs South Africa in UAE:
5th ODI in Dubai:  317/5 (50 overs);  260 (44.5 overs). South Africa win by 57 runs; win the 5-match series 3–2.
New Zealand in India:
1st Test in Ahmedabad, day 5:  487 and 266 (102.4 overs; Harbhajan Singh 115, Chris Martin 5/63);  459 and 22/1 (10 overs). Match drawn; 3-match series level 0–0.

Fencing
World Championships in Paris, France:
Men's épée:  Nikolai Novosjolov   Gauthier Grumier   Gábor Boczkó  and Jean-Michel Lucenay 
Women's épée:  Maureen Nisima   Emese Szász   Tatiana Logounova  and Nathalie Moellhausen

Football (soccer)
CONCACAF Women's Gold Cup in Cancún, Mexico:
3rd place playoff:  0–3  
The USA will play against  in the UEFA-CONCACAF play-off for a place in the 2011 FIFA Women's World Cup.
Final:   1–0  
Canada win the title for the second time, and the first time with the USA also competing.
African Women's Championship in South Africa: (teams in bold advance to the semifinals)
Group B:
 1–3 
 2–1 
Final standings: Equatorial Guinea, Cameroon 7 points, Ghana 3, Algeria 0.
Sudamericano Femenino in Ecuador:
Group A:
 3–0 
 2–0 
Standings: Argentina 9 points (3 matches), Chile 6 (3),  3 (2), Peru, Bolivia 0 (2).

November 7, 2010 (Sunday)

American football
NFL Week 9:
Atlanta Falcons 27, Tampa Bay Buccaneers 21
Bills Toronto Series: Chicago Bears 22, Buffalo Bills 19 in Toronto
Cleveland Browns 34, New England Patriots 14
New York Jets 23, Detroit Lions 20 (OT)
New Orleans Saints 34, Carolina Panthers 3
Baltimore Ravens 26, Miami Dolphins 10
San Diego Chargers 29, Houston Texans 23
Minnesota Vikings 27, Arizona Cardinals 24 (OT)
New York Giants 41, Seattle Seahawks 7
Philadelphia Eagles 26, Indianapolis Colts 24
Oakland Raiders 23, Kansas City Chiefs 20 (OT)
Sunday Night Football: Green Bay Packers 45, Dallas Cowboys 7
Byes: Denver Broncos, Jacksonville Jaguars, St. Louis Rams, San Francisco 49ers, Tennessee Titans, Washington Redskins

Athletics
World Marathon Majors:
New York City Marathon:
Men:  Gebregziabher Gebremariam  2:08:14  Emmanuel Kipchirchir Mutai  2:09:18  Moses Kigen Kipkosgei  2:10:39
After the race, Haile Gebrselassie announces his retirement, but he reverses his decision on November 15.
Women:  Edna Kiplagat  2:28:20  Shalane Flanagan  2:28:40  Mary Jepkosgei Keitany  2:29:01
2009–10 series final standings:
Men: (1) Samuel Wanjiru  75 points (2) Tsegaye Kebede  65 (3) Mutai 50.
Women: (1) Liliya Shobukhova  85 points (2) Irina Mikitenko  41 (3) Salina Kosgei  36.

Auto racing
Formula One:
 in São Paulo: (1) Sebastian Vettel  (Red Bull–Renault) (2) Mark Webber  (Red Bull-Renault) (3) Fernando Alonso  (Ferrari)
Drivers' championship standings (after 18 of 19 races): (1) Alonso 246 points (2) Webber 238 (3) Vettel 231
Constructors' championship standings: (1) Red Bull 469 points (2) McLaren 421 (3) Ferrari 389
Red Bull win the constructors' championship for the first time.
Chase for the Sprint Cup:
AAA Texas 500 in Fort Worth: (1)  Denny Hamlin (Toyota; Joe Gibbs Racing) (2)  Matt Kenseth (Ford; Roush Fenway Racing) (3)  Mark Martin (Chevrolet; Hendrick Motorsports)
Drivers' championship standings (after 34 of 36 races): (1) Hamlin 6325 points (2)  Jimmie Johnson (Chevrolet; Hendrick Motorsports) 6292 (3)  Kevin Harvick (Chevrolet; Richard Childress Racing) 6266

Badminton
BWF Super Series:
French Super Series in Paris
Men's singles: Taufik Hidayat  def. Joachim Persson  21–16, 21–11
Women's singles: Wang Yihan  def. Li Xuerui  21–13, 21–9
Men's doubles: Mathias Boe /Carsten Mogensen  def. Ingo Kindervater /Johannes Schöttler  21–15, 21–9
Women's doubles: Duanganong Aroonkesorn /Kunchala Voravichitchaikul  def. Petya Nedelcheva /Anastasia Russkikh  21–16, 11–2
Mixed doubles: Sudket Prapakamol /Saralee Thungthongkam  def. Michael Fuchs /Birgit Overzier  21–15, 21–15

Baseball
Japan Series:
Game 7, Chiba Lotte Marines 8, Chunichi Dragons 7. Marines win series 4–2–1.
The Marines win the Series for the fourth time in franchise history and the second time with the current name.

Cricket
Sri Lanka in Australia:
3rd ODI in Brisbane:  115 (32 overs; Clint McKay 5/33);  119/2 (21.4 overs). Australia win by 8 wickets; Sri Lanka win 3-match series 2–1.
New Zealand in India:
1st Test in Ahmedabad, day 4:  487 and 82/6 (40 overs; Chris Martin 5/25);  459 (165.4 overs; Kane Williamson 131). India lead by 110 runs with 4 wickets remaining.

Cycling
European Track Championships in Pruszków, Poland:
Men's:
Madison:      
Keirin:  Jason Kenny   Matthew Crampton   Adam Ptáčník 
Omnium:  Roger Kluge   Tim Veldt   Rafał Ratajczyk 
Women's:
Keirin:  Olga Panarina   Simona Krupeckaitė   Lyubov Shulika 
Omnium:  Leire Dorronsoro   Tatsiana Sharakova   Małgorzata Wojtyra

Equestrianism
Show jumping:
FEI World Cup Western European League:
4th competition in Verona (CSI 5*-W):  Jeroen Dubbeldam  on Simon  Meredith Michaels-Beerbaum  on Shutterfly  Rolf-Göran Bengtsson  on Casall
Standings (after 4 of 13 competitions): (1) Kevin Staut  43 points (2) Christian Ahlmann  40 (3) Michaels-Beerbaum 37
6th competition in Munich (CSI 4*):  Marcus Ehning  on Sandro Boy  Mario Stevens on D'Avignon   Denis Lynch  on Abbervail van het Dingeshof
Final standings: (1) Lynch 60 points (2) Ehning 57 (3) Heiko Schmidt  41
Eventing:
HSBC FEI Classics:
5th competition – Étoiles de Pau (CCI 4*):  Andreas Dibowski  on FRH Fantasia  William Fox-Pitt  on Navigator  Karin Donckers  on Charizard
Final standings: (1) Fox-Pitt 39 points (2) Dibowski 37 (3) Caroline Powell  21

Fencing
World Championships in Paris, France:
Men's foil:  Peter Joppich   Lei Sheng   Gerek Meinhardt  and Yuki Ota 
Women's foil:  Elisa Di Francisca   Arianna Errigo   Nam Hyun-Hee  and Valentina Vezzali

Football (soccer)
African Women's Championship in South Africa: (teams in bold advance to the semifinals)
Group A:
 0–4 
 0–3 
Final standings: Nigeria 9 points, South Africa 6, Mali 3, Tanzania 0.
Sudamericano Femenino in Ecuador:
Group B:
 0–4 
 0–4 
Standings: Brazil 6 points (2 matches),  3 (1), Paraguay 3 (2), Uruguay 0 (1), Venezuela 0 (2).
 MLS Cup Playoffs:
Western Conference Semifinal, second leg in Carson, California (first leg score in parentheses):
Los Angeles Galaxy 2–1 (1–0) Seattle Sounders FC. Galaxy win 3–1 on aggregate.
 Allsvenskan, final matchday: (team in bold qualify for the Champions League, teams in italics qualify for the Europa League)
Malmö FF 2–0 Mjällby AIF
Helsingborgs IF 0–0 Kalmar FF
Final standings: Malmö FF 67 points, Helsingborgs IF 65, Örebro SK 52, IF Elfsborg 47.
Malmö win the title for the 16th time after 6 years break.

Golf
World Golf Championships:
WGC-HSBC Champions in Shanghai, China:
Winner: Francesco Molinari  269 (−19)
Molinari wins his second European Tour title.
LPGA Tour:
Mizuno Classic in Shima, Mie, Japan:
Winner: Jiyai Shin  198 (−18)
Shin wins her second LPGA title of the season and the eighth of her career.
Champions Tour:
Charles Schwab Cup Championship in San Francisco:
Winner: John Cook  267 (−17)
Cook repeats his 2009 victory and wins his fifth Champions Tour title.
Bernhard Langer  wins the Charles Schwab Cup points race for the first time, and wins a third consecutive season money title.

Motorcycle racing
Moto GP:
Valencian Grand Prix in Valencia, Spain:
MotoGP: (1) Jorge Lorenzo  (Yamaha) (2) Casey Stoner  (Ducati) (3) Valentino Rossi  (Yamaha)
Final riders' championship standings: (1) Lorenzo 383 points (2) Dani Pedrosa  (Honda) 245 (3) Rossi 233
Final manufacturers' championship standings: (1) Yamaha 404 points (2) Honda 342 (3) Ducati 286
Moto2: (1) Karel Abraham  (FTR) (2) Andrea Iannone  (Speed Up) (3) Julián Simón  (Suter)
Final riders' championship standings: (1) Toni Elías  (Moriwaki) 271 points (2) Simón 201 (3) Iannone 199
Final manufacturers' championship standings: (1) Suter 322 points (2) Moriwaki 309 (3) Speed Up 232
125cc: (1) Bradley Smith  (Aprilia) (2) Pol Espargaró  (Derbi) (3) Nicolás Terol  (Aprilia)
Final riders' championship standings: (1) Marc Márquez  (Derbi) 310 points (2) Terol 296 (3) Espargaró 281
Márquez seals his first championship title.
Manufacturers' championship standings: (1) Derbi 405 points (2) Aprilia 348 (3) Honda 27

Rowing
World Championships in Cambridge, New Zealand:
LW1x:   7:43.45   7:48.48   7:49.04
LM1x:   7:05.82   7:08.19   7:09.86
W2x:   7:04.70   7:10.08   7:14.40
M2x:   6:22.63   6:24.21   6:28.54
LM8+:   5:48.61   5:50.27   5:52.24
W8+:   6:12.42   6:16.12   6:18.96
M8+:   5:33.84   5:34.46   5:35.96

Snooker
World Seniors Championship in Bradford, England:
Semi-final: John Parrott  2–3 Jimmy White 
Final: Steve Davis  1–4 White

Tennis
Fed Cup Final in San Diego, day 2:  1–3 
Melanie Oudin  def. Francesca Schiavone  6–3, 6–1
Flavia Pennetta  def. CoCo Vandeweghe  6–1, 6–2
Italy repeat their 2009 victory over the United States, and win their third Fed Cup.
ATP World Tour:
Valencia Open 500 in Valencia, Spain:
Final: David Ferrer  def. Marcel Granollers  7–5, 6–3
Ferrer wins the ninth title of his career.
Davidoff Swiss Indoors in Basel, Switzerland:
Final: Roger Federer  def. Novak Djokovic  6–4, 3–6, 6–1
Federer wins his fourth title of the year and the 65th of his career.
WTA Tour:
Commonwealth Bank Tournament of Champions in Bali, Indonesia:
Final: Ana Ivanovic  def. Alisa Kleybanova  6–2, 7–6(5)
Ivanovic wins her second title of the year and the tenth of her career.

Volleyball
Women's World Championship in Japan:
Pool E in Tokyo:
 1–3 
 3–1 
 0–3 
 3–1 
Standings (after 5 matches): Russia 10 points, Japan 9, South Korea, Serbia 8, Poland, Turkey 7, China 6, Peru 5.
Pool F in Nagoya:
 1–3 
 0–3 
 3–1 
 3–1 
Standings (after 5 matches): Brazil 10 points, United States 9, Germany, Italy 8, Netherlands 7, Cuba, Czech Republic, Thailand 6.

November 6, 2010 (Saturday)

American football
NCAA (unbeaten teams in bold):
BCS Top 10:
(1) Oregon 53, Washington 16
(2) Auburn 62, Chattanooga 24
(3) TCU 47, (5) Utah 7
(4) Boise State 42, Hawaii 7
(10) LSU 24, (6) Alabama 21
(7) Nebraska 31, Iowa State 30 (OT)
Texas A&M 33, (8) Oklahoma 19
(9) Wisconsin 34, Purdue 13
Other games:
Texas Tech 24, (12) Missouri 17
(13) Stanford 42, (15) Arizona 17
(17) Oklahoma State 55, (21) Baylor 28
(18) Arkansas 41, (19) South Carolina 20
North Carolina 37, (24) Florida State 35
Clemson 14, (25) North Carolina State 13

Auto racing
Nationwide Series:
O'Reilly Challenge in Fort Worth: (1)  Carl Edwards (Ford; Roush Fenway Racing) (2)  Kyle Busch (Toyota; Joe Gibbs Racing) (3)  Brad Keselowski (Dodge; Penske Racing)
Drivers' championship standings (after 33 of 35 races): (1) Keselowski 5314 points (2) Edwards 4849 (3) Busch 4619
Keselowski clinches his first series championship.

Baseball
Japan Series:
Game 6, Chiba Lotte Marines 2, Chunichi Dragons 2 (15 innings). Marines lead series 3–2–1.

Cricket
New Zealand in India:
1st Test in Ahmedabad, day 3:  487;  331/5 (117.3 overs; Jesse Ryder 103). New Zealand trail by 156 runs with 5 wickets remaining in the 1st innings.

Cycling
European Track Championships in Pruszków, Poland:
Men's Sprint:  Denis Dmitriev   Kévin Sireau   Jason Kenny 
Women's Sprint:  Sandie Clair   Kristina Vogel   Simona Krupeckaitė

Fencing
World Championships in Paris, France:
Men's sabre:  Won Woo-Young   Nicolas Limbach   Cosmin Hănceanu  and Veniamin Reshetnikov 
Women's sabre:  Mariel Zagunis   Olha Kharlan   Olena Khomrova  and Sophia Velikaia

Figure skating
ISU Grand Prix:
Cup of China in Beijing, China: (skaters in bold qualify for the Final)
Ice Dance:  Nathalie Péchalat / Fabian Bourzat  159.59  Ekaterina Bobrova / Dmitri Soloviev  145.39  Federica Faiella / Massimo Scali  139.52
Standings (after 3 of 6 events): Meryl Davis / Charlie White , Péchalat / Bourzat, Vanessa Crone / Paul Poirier  15 points (1 event), Sinead Kerr / John Kerr , Bobrova / Soloviev, Kaitlyn Weaver / Andrew Poje  13 (1), Faiella / Scali, Madison Chock / Greg Zuerlein , Maia Shibutani / Alex Shibutani  11 (1).
Ladies:  Miki Ando  172.21  Akiko Suzuki  162.86  Alena Leonova  148.61
Standings (after 3 of 6 events): Alissa Czisny , Ando, Carolina Kostner  15 points (1 event), Ksenia Makarova , Suzuki, Rachael Flatt  13 (1), Amélie Lacoste , Kanako Murakami , Leonova 11 (1).
Men:  Takahiko Kozuka  233.51  Brandon Mroz  216.80  Tomáš Verner  214.81
Standings (after 3 of 6 events): Patrick Chan , Daisuke Takahashi , Kozuka 15 points (1 event), Nobunari Oda , Jeremy Abbott , Mroz 13 (1), Adam Rippon , Verner, Florent Amodio  11 (1).
Pairs:  Pang Qing / Tong Jian  177.50  Sui Wenjing / Han Cong  171.47  Caitlin Yankowskas / John Coughlin  166.72
Standings (after 3 of 6 events): Pang / Tong 30 points (2 events), Lubov Iliushechkina / Nodari Maisuradze  24 (2), Yankowskas / Coughlin 20 (2), Vera Bazarova / Yuri Larionov , Sui / Han, Kirsten Moore-Towes / Dylan Moscovitch  13 (1), Paige Lawrence / Rudi Swiegers , Narumi Takahashi / Mervin Tran  11 (1).

Football (soccer)
Sudamericano Femenino in Ecuador:
Group A:
 1–2 
 2–1 
Standings: Argentina 6 points (2 matches), Chile, Ecuador 3 (2), Peru,  0 (1).
Caribbean Championship Qualifying Group Stage Two:
Group F in Marabella, Trinidad and Tobago: (teams in bold qualify for the Final Tournament)
 2–0 
 4–0 
Final standings: Trinidad and Tobago 9 points, Guyana, Haiti 4, Saint Vincent 0.
AFC Cup Final, in Kuwait City:
Al-Qadsia  1–1 (2–4 pen.)  Al-Ittihad
Al-Ittihad win the Cup for the first time.
 MLS Cup Playoffs:
Conference Semifinals (first leg scores in parentheses):
Eastern Conference, second leg in Columbus, Ohio:
Columbus Crew 2–1 (0–1) Colorado Rapids. 2–2 on aggregate; Rapids win 5–4 on penalties.
Western Conference, second leg in Sandy, Utah:
Real Salt Lake 1–1 (1–2) FC Dallas. Dallas win 3–2 on aggregate.

Horse racing
Breeders' Cup in Louisville, Kentucky
Sprint:  Big Drama (trainer: David Fawkes; jockey: Eibar Coa)  Hamazing Destiny (trainer: D. Wayne Lukas; jockey: Joel Rosario)  Smiling Tiger (trainer: Jeff Bonde; jockey: Russell Baze)
Turf Sprint:  Chamberlain Bridge (trainer: W. Bret Calhoun; jockey: Jamie Theriot)  Central City (trainer: Ronny W. Werner; jockey: Robby Albarado)  Unzip Me (trainer: Martin F. Jones; jockey: Rafael Bejarano)
Juvenile:  Uncle Mo (trainer: Todd Pletcher; jockey: John R. Velazquez)  Boys At Tosconova (trainer: Richard E. Dutrow Jr.; jockey: Ramon A. Dominguez)  Rogue Romance (trainer: Kenneth McPeek; jockey: Julien Leparoux)
Mile:  Goldikova (trainer: Freddy Head; jockey: Olivier Peslier)  Gio Ponti (trainer: Christophe Clement; jockey: Ramon A. Dominguez)  The Usual Q. T. (trainer: Jim Cassidy; jockey: Victor Espinoza)
Goldikova becomes the first horse to win at three successive Breeders' Cups.
Dirt Mile:  Dakota Phone (trainer: Jerry Hollendorfer; jockey: Joel Rosario)  Morning Line (trainer: Nick Zito; jockey: Javier Castellano)  Gayego (trainer: Saeed bin Suroor; jockey: Frankie Dettori)
Turf:  Dangerous Midge (trainer: Brian Meehan; jockey: Frankie Dettori)  Champ Pegasus (trainer: Richard E. Mandella; jockey: Joel Rosario)  Behkabad (trainer: Jean-Claude Rouget; jockey: Christophe Lemaire)
Classic:  Blame (trainer: Albert Stall Jr.; jockey: Garrett K. Gomez)  Zenyatta (trainer: John Shirreffs; jockey: Mike E. Smith)  Fly Down (trainer: Nick Zito; jockey: Julien Leparoux)
Zenyatta ends her career with a record of 19–1.

Rowing
World Championships in Cambridge, New Zealand:
LM4-:   6:10.71   6:10.78   6:10.79
M2-:   6:30.16   6:30.48   6:36.00
W1x:   7:47.61   7:47.79   7:49.64
M1x:   6:47.49   6:49.42   6:49.83
W2-:   7:17.12   7:20.24   7:22.46
M2+:   7:03.32   7:04.38   7:06.20
LW4x:   6:44.94   6:47.99   6:49.50
LM4x:   6:11.44   6:14.02   6:14.94

Rugby league
Four Nations: (teams in bold advance to the final)
Round three in Auckland:
 36–10 
 20–34 
Final standings: Australia 6 points, New Zealand 4, England 2, Papua New Guinea 0.

Rugby union
End of year tests:
Week 3:
 75–3  in Tokyo
 12–43  in Brussels
 16–26  in London
 16–25  in Cardiff
 21–23  in Dublin

Snooker
World Seniors Championship in Bradford, England:
Quarter-finals:
Ken Doherty  0–2 Nigel Bond 
Steve Davis  2–0 Joe Johnson 
Dennis Taylor  0–2 John Parrott 
Jimmy White  2–0 Cliff Thorburn 
Semi-final: Davis 3–1 Bond

Tennis
Fed Cup Final in San Diego, day 1:  0–2 
Francesca Schiavone  def. CoCo Vandeweghe  6–2, 6–4
Flavia Pennetta  def. Bethanie Mattek-Sands  7–6(4), 6–2

Volleyball
Women's World Championship in Japan:
Pool E in Tokyo:
 0–3 
 0–3 
 3–2 
 1–3 
Standings (after 4 matches): Russia 8 points, Japan 7, Poland, Turkey, South Korea, Serbia 6, China 5, Peru 4.
Pool F in Nagoya:
 3–1 
 0–3 
 3–0 
 3–1 
Standings (after 4 matches): Brazil, United States 8 points, Netherlands, Germany, Italy 6, Cuba, Czech Republic 5, Thailand 4.

November 5, 2010 (Friday)

Cricket
Pakistan vs South Africa in UAE:
4th ODI in Dubai:  274/6 (50 overs);  275/9 (49.5 overs). Pakistan win by 1 wicket; 5-match series level 2–2.
Sri Lanka in Australia:
2nd ODI in Sydney:  213/3 (41.1/45 overs);  210 (37.4/38 overs). Sri Lanka win by 29 runs (D/L); lead 3-match series 2–0.
New Zealand in India:
1st Test in Ahmedabad, day 2:  487 (151.5 overs);  69/2 (28 overs). New Zealand trail by 418 runs with 8 wickets remaining in the 1st innings.

Cycling
European Track Championships in Pruszków, Poland:
Men's:
Team pursuit:   4:00.482   4:04.274   4:06.049
Team sprint:   44.066   44.281   43.968
Women's:
Team pursuit:   3:23.435   3.29.992   3:28.127
Team sprint:   33.478   33.586   33.708

Figure skating
ISU Grand Prix:
Cup of China in Beijing, China:
Ice Dance Short Dance: (1) Nathalie Péchalat / Fabian Bourzat  64.12 (2) Federica Faiella / Massimo Scali  57.21 (3) Ekaterina Bobrova / Dmitri Soloviev  55.85
Ladies' Short Program: (1) Mirai Nagasu  58.76 (2) Akiko Suzuki  57.97 (3) Miki Ando  56.11
Men's Short Program: (1) Takahiko Kozuka  77.40 (2) Brian Joubert  74.80 (3) Tomáš Verner  70.31
Pairs' Short Program: (1) Pang Qing / Tong Jian  60.62 (2) Sui Wenjing / Han Cong  59.58 (3) Caitlin Yankowskas / John Coughlin  57.86

Football (soccer)
CONCACAF Women's Gold Cup in Cancún, Mexico:
Semifinals (winners qualify directly for the 2011 FIFA Women's World Cup):
 4–0 
 1–2 
The USA suffer their first ever loss in this competition, and also their first ever loss to Mexico.
African Women's Championship in South Africa:
Group B:
 1–0 
 1–2 
Standings (after 2 matches): Cameroon, Equatorial Guinea 4 points, Ghana 3, Algeria 0.
Sudamericano Femenino in Ecuador:
Group B:
 0–3 
 4–0

Horse racing
Breeders' Cup in Louisville, Kentucky:
Marathon:  Eldaafer (trainer: Diane Alvarado; jockey: John R. Velazquez)  Gabriel's Hill (trainer: Seth Benzel; jockey: Julien Leparoux)  A. U. Miner (trainer: Clark Hanna; jockey: Calvin Borel)
Juvenile Fillies Turf:  More Than Real (trainer: Todd Pletcher; jockey: Garrett K. Gomez)  Winter Memories (trainer: James J. Toner; jockey: Jose Lezcano)  Kathmanblu (trainer: Kenneth McPeek; jockey: Julien Leparoux)
Filly & Mare Sprint:  Dubai Majesty (trainer: W. Bret Calhoun; jockey: Jamie Theriot)  Switch (trainer: John W. Sadler; jockey: Joel Rosario)  Evening Jewel (trainer: James Cassidy; jockey: Victor Espinoza)
Juvenile Fillies:  Awesome Feather (trainer: Stanley I. Gold; jockey: Jeffrey Sanchez)  R Heat Lightning (trainer: Todd Pletcher; jockey: John R. Velazquez)  Delightful Mary (trainer: Mark Casse; jockey: Shaun Bridgmohan)
Filly & Mare Turf:  Shared Account (trainer: H. Graham Motion; jockey: Edgar Prado)  Midday (trainer: Henry Cecil; jockey: Tom Queally)  Keertana (trainer: Thomas F. Proctor; jockey: Jose Lezcano)
Ladies' Classic:  Unrivaled Belle (trainer: William I. Mott; jockey: Kent Desormeaux)  Blind Luck (trainer: Jerry Hollendorfer; jockey: Joel Rosario)  Havre De Grace (trainer: Anthony W. Dutrow; jockey: Jeremy Rose)

Rowing
World Championships in Cambridge, New Zealand:
LM2-:   7:18.92   7:21.29   7:23.79
LW2x:   8:06.20   8:07.33   8:09.14
LM2x:   7:13.47   7:15.88   7:18.31
M4-:   6:45.38   6:47.15   6:48.38
W4x:   7:12.78   7:14.95   7:15.26
M4x:   6:15.78   6:17.04   6:18.93
W4-:   7:21.09   7:23.99   7:24.56

Rugby union
 ITM Cup Final in Christchurch:
Canterbury 33–13 Waikato
Canterbury win their third consecutive title.

Snooker
World Seniors Championship in Bradford, England:
Pre-qualifying: Peter Ebdon  0–2 Nigel Bond

November 4, 2010 (Thursday)

Baseball
Japan Series:
Game 5, Chiba Lotte Marines 10, Chunichi Dragons 4. Marines lead series 3–2.

Basketball
Euroleague:
Regular Season, matchday 3 (unbeaten teams in bold):
Group A: Partizan Belgrade  54–67  Maccabi Tel Aviv
Group B: Virtus Roma  56–74  Real Madrid
Group C:
Cholet Basket  73–69  Lietuvos Rytas
Regal FC Barcelona  61–69  Fenerbahçe Ülker
Group D: Union Olimpija Ljubljana  85–84 (OT)  Panathinaikos Athens

Cricket
New Zealand in India:
1st Test in Ahmedabad, day 1:  329/3 (90 overs; Virender Sehwag 173, Rahul Dravid 104); .

Football (soccer)
African Women's Championship in South Africa:
Group A: (team in bold advance to the semi-finals)
 1–2 
 3–2 
Standings (after 2 matches): Nigeria 6 points, South Africa, Mali 3, Tanzania 0.
Sudamericano Femenino in Ecuador:
Group A:
 3–0 
 1–2 
Caribbean Championship Qualifying Group Stage Two:
Group F in Marabella, Trinidad and Tobago: (team in bold qualify for the Final Tournament)
 1–3 
 2–1 
Standings (after 2 matches): Trinidad and Tobago 6 points, Haiti 4, Guyana 1, Saint Vincent 0.
UEFA Europa League group stage, matchday 4: (teams in bold advance to the knockout stages)
Group A:
Lech Poznań  3–1  Manchester City
Juventus  0–0  Red Bull Salzburg
Standings (after 4 matches): Lech Poznań, Manchester City 7 points, Juventus 4, Red Bull Salzburg 2.
Group B:
Rosenborg  1–2  Atlético Madrid
Bayer Leverkusen  1–0  Aris
Standings (after 4 matches): Bayer Leverkusen 8 points, Atlético Madrid 7, Aris 4, Rosenborg 3.
Group C:
Gent  3–1  Sporting CP
Levski Sofia  2–2  Lille
Standings (after 4 matches): Sporting CP 9 points, Lille 5, Levski Sofia, Gent 4.
Group D:
PAOK  1–0  Villarreal
Club Brugge  0–2  Dinamo Zagreb
Standings (after 4 matches): PAOK, Dinamo Zagreb 7 points, Villarreal 6, Club Brugge 2.
Group E:
BATE  3–1  Sheriff Tiraspol
Dynamo Kyiv  2–0  AZ
Standings (after 4 matches): BATE 10 points, Dynamo Kyiv 7, Arizona, Sheriff Tiraspol 3.
Group F:
CSKA Moscow  3–1  Palermo
Lausanne-Sport  1–3  Sparta Prague
Standings (after 4 matches): CSKA Moscow 12 points, Sparta Prague 7, Palermo 3, Lausanne-Sport 1.
Group G:
Hajduk Split  2–3  Zenit St. Petersburg
AEK Athens  1–1  Anderlecht
Standings (after 4 matches): Zenit St. Petersburg 12 points, Anderlecht, AEK Athens 4, Hajduk Split 3.
Group H:
Odense  2–0  Young Boys
Getafe  0–3  Stuttgart
Standings (after 4 matches): Stuttgart 12 points, Young Boys 6, Getafe, Odense 3.
Group I:
Sampdoria  0–0  Metalist Kharkiv
PSV Eindhoven  3–0  Debrecen
Standings (after 4 matches): PSV Eindhoven 10 points, Metalist Kharkiv 7, Sampdoria 5, Debrecen 0.
Group J:
Paris Saint-Germain  0–0  Borussia Dortmund
Sevilla  4–0  Karpaty Lviv
Standings (after 4 matches): Sevilla 9 points, Paris Saint-Germain 8, Borussia Dortmund 5, Karpaty Lviv 0.
Group K:
Steaua București  3–1  Utrecht
Liverpool  3–1  Napoli
Standings (after 4 matches): Liverpool 8 points, Steaua București 5, Napoli, Utrecht 3.
Group L:
Rapid Wien  1–2  CSKA Sofia
Porto  1–1  Beşiktaş
Standings (after 4 matches): Porto 10 points, Beşiktaş 7, Rapid Wien, CSKA Sofia 3.
 MLS Cup Playoffs:
Eastern Conference Semifinal, second leg in Harrison, New Jersey (first leg score in parentheses):
New York Red Bulls 1–3 (1–0) San Jose Earthquakes. Earthquakes win 3–2 on aggregate.

Rowing
World Championships in Cambridge, New Zealand:
ASW1x:   6:43.18   6:47.60   7:37.46
ASM1x:   5:19.36   5:32.67   5:33.39
TAMix2x:   4:24.71   4:28.05   4:28.16
IDMix4+:   4:09.58   4:30.37   5:00.28
LTAMix4+:   3:36.53   3:37.08   3:39.65

Snooker
Premier League week 8 in Weston-super-Mare: (player in bold advances to the semi-finals, player in strike is eliminated)
Marco Fu  4–2 Neil Robertson 
Shaun Murphy  3–3 Mark Selby 
Standings: Fu 8 points (6 matches), Selby, Mark Williams  5 (5), Ronnie O'Sullivan  5 (4), Murphy 4 (4), Ding Junhui  4 (6), Robertson 3 (4).

Snowboarding
World Cup in Saas-Fee, Switzerland:
Men's Halfpipe:  Tore Viken Holvik   Ryō Aono   Mathieu Crépel 
Women's Halfpipe:  Cai Xuetong   Sun Zhifeng   Ursina Haller

November 3, 2010 (Wednesday)

Baseball
Japan Series:
Game 4, Chunichi Dragons 4, Chiba Lotte Marines 3 (11 innings). Series tied 2–2.

Basketball
Euroleague:
Regular Season, matchday 3 (unbeaten teams in bold):
Group A:
Khimki Moscow  64–60  Caja Laboral
Žalgiris Kaunas  74–68 (OT)  Asseco Prokom Gdynia
Group B:
Olympiacos Piraeus  93–66  Unicaja Málaga
Brose Baskets  79–69  Spirou Basket
Group C: Montepaschi Siena  80–57  KK Cibona Zagreb
Group D:
Efes Pilsen Istanbul  82–74  Armani Jeans Milano
Power Electronics Valencia  82–57  CSKA Moscow

Cricket
Sri Lanka in Australia:
1st ODI in Melbourne:  239/8 (50 overs; Thisara Perera 5/46);  243/9 (44.2 overs). Sri Lanka win by 1 wicket; lead 3-match series 1–0.
Angelo Mathews and Lasith Malinga set a One Day International record stand of 132 runs for the ninth wicket.

Football (soccer)
UEFA Champions League group stage, matchday 4: (teams in bold advance to the knockout stage)
Group E:
Basel  2–3  Roma
CFR Cluj  0–4  Bayern Munich
Standings (after 4 matches): Bayern Munich 12 points, Roma 6, CFR Cluj, Basel 3.
Group F:
Chelsea  4–1  Spartak Moscow
Žilina  0–7  Marseille
Standings (after 4 matches): Chelsea 12 points, Spartak Moscow, Marseille 6, Žilina 0.
Group G:
Auxerre  2–1  Ajax
Milan  2–2  Real Madrid
Filippo Inzaghi scores both goals for Milan to get level with Raúl as the top scorer in European club competitions with 70 goals.
Standings (after 4 matches): Real Madrid 10 points, Milan 5, Ajax 4, Auxerre 3.
Group H:
Partizan  0–1  Braga
Shakhtar Donetsk  2–1  Arsenal
Standings (after 4 matches): Arsenal, Shakhtar Donetsk 9 points, Braga 6, Partizan 0.
Copa Sudamericana Quarterfinals, first leg:
Deportes Tolima  2–2  Independiente

Volleyball
Women's World Championship in Japan: (teams in bold advance to the second round)
Pool A in Tokyo:
 3–1 
 0–3 
 3–1 
Final standings: Japan 10 points, Serbia 9, Poland 8, Peru 7, Costa Rica 6, Algeria 5.
Pool B in Hamamatsu:
 0–3 
 0–3 
 0–3 
Final standings: Brazil 10 points, Netherlands, Italy, Czech Republic 8, Puerto Rico 6, Kenya 5.
Pool C in Matsumoto:
 0–3 
 3–0 
 1–3 
Final standings: USA 10 points, Germany 9, Cuba, Thailand, Croatia 7, Kazakhstan 5.
Pool D in Osaka:
 1–3 
 3–2 
 0–3 
Final standings: Russia 10 points, South Korea 9, Turkey 8, China 7, Dominican Republic 6, Canada 5.

November 2, 2010 (Tuesday)

Baseball
Japan Series:
Game 3, Chiba Lotte Marines 7, Chunichi Dragons 1. Marines lead series 2–1.

Cricket
Pakistan vs South Africa in UAE:
3rd ODI in Dubai:  228/9 (50 overs; Hashim Amla 119*);  226/9 (50 overs). South Africa win by 2 runs; lead 5-match series 2–1.

Football (soccer)
African Women's Championship in South Africa:
Group B:
 2–2 
 1–2 
CONCACAF Women's Gold Cup in Cancún, Mexico: (teams in bold advance to the semifinals)
Group A:
 1–4 
 0–3 
Final standings: Canada 9 points, Mexico 6, Trinidad and Tobago 3, Guyana 0.
Caribbean Championship Qualifying Group Stage Two:
Group F in Marabella, Trinidad and Tobago:
 0–0 
 6–2 
UEFA Champions League group stage, matchday 4:
Group A:
Tottenham Hotspur  3–1  Internazionale
Werder Bremen  0–2  Twente
Standings (after 4 matches): Tottenham Hotspur, Internazionale 7 points, Twente 5, Werder Bremen 2.
Group B:
Hapoel Tel Aviv  0–0  Schalke 04
Benfica  4–3  Lyon
Standings (after 4 matches): Lyon 9 points, Schalke 04 7, Benfica 6, Hapoel Tel Aviv 1.
Group C:
Valencia  3–0  Rangers
Bursaspor  0–3  Manchester United
Standings (after 4 matches): Manchester United 10 points, Valencia 7, Rangers 5, Bursaspor 0.
Group D:
Rubin Kazan  0–0  Panathinaikos
Copenhagen  1–1  Barcelona
Standings (after 4 matches): Barcelona 8 points, Copenhagen 7, Rubin Kazan 3, Panathinaikos 2.
Copa Sudamericana Quarterfinals, first leg:
Newell's Old Boys  0–0  LDU Quito

Horse racing
Melbourne Cup in Melbourne:  Americain (trainer: Alain de Royer-Dupré; jockey: Gérald Mossé)  Maluckyday (trainer: John Hawkes; jockey: Luke Nolen)  So You Think (trainer: Bart Cummings; jockey: Steven Arnold)

Volleyball
Women's World Championship in Japan: (teams in bold advance to the second round)
Pool A in Tokyo:
 3–0 
 3–0 
 0–3 
Standings (after 4 matches): Japan, Serbia 8 points, Poland 6, Peru, Costa Rica 5, Algeria 4.
Pool B in Hamamatsu:
 3–0 
 3–0 
 3–2 
Standings (after 4 matches): Brazil 8 points, Italy 7, Netherlands, Czech Republic 6, Puerto Rico 5, Kenya 4.
Pool C in Matsumoto:
 0–3 
 0–3 
 3–0 
Standings (after 4 matches): USA 8 points, Germany 7, Thailand, Cuba 6, Croatia 5, Kazakhstan 4.
Pool D in Osaka:
 3–2 
 3–1 
 0–3 
Standings (after 4 matches): Russia 8 points, South Korea, Turkey 7, China 6, Dominican Republic, Canada 4.

November 1, 2010 (Monday)

American football
NFL Monday Night Football, Week 8: Indianapolis Colts 30, Houston Texans 17

Baseball
World Series:
Game 5, San Francisco Giants 3, Texas Rangers 1. Giants win series 4–1.
The Giants win their first World Series since 1954, when they were in New York. Édgar Rentería, whose three-run homer in the seventh inning gave the Giants all the runs they needed, is named Series MVP.

Football (soccer)
African Women's Championship in South Africa:
Group A:  5–0 
CONCACAF Women's Gold Cup in Cancún, Mexico: (teams in bold advance to the semifinals)
Group B:
 0–1 
 4–0 
Final standings: United States 9 points, Costa Rica 6, Haiti 3, Guatemala 0.

References

XI